= List of blockchains =

This is a list of blockchains—decentralized, cryptographic databases—and other distributed ledgers.

== List ==
Name	Date created	Created by	Native cryptocurrency	Consensus algorithm	Programmable?	Private? (Note: Defined as per ISO 22739:2020 - Blockchain and distributed ledger technologies standard (see https://www.iso.org/obp/ui/#iso:std:iso:22739:ed-1:v1:en): Public - blockchain/DLT system which is accessible to the public for use.; Private - blockchain/DLT that is accessible for use only to a limited group of DLT users.; Permissioned - requiring authorization to perform a particular activity or activities.; Permissionless - not requiring authorization to perform any particular activity.)	Permissioned?	Finality	Ledger state	Notes	Refs.
Bitcoin	Jan 3, 2009	Satoshi Nakamoto	BTC	PoW with Nakamoto Consensus	Yes (scripts)	No	No	Probabilistic	UTXO	First and most well-known blockchain.	
Litecoin	Oct 8, 2011	Charlie Lee	LTC	PoW	Yes (scripts)	Yes					
Peercoin	Aug 19, 2012		PPC	PoW	Yes (scripts)	No					
Primecoin	Jul 7, 2013	Sunny King	XPM	PoW						Work is finding long Cunningham chains of prime numbers	
MazaCoin	2014?	Payu Harris, AnonymousPirate	MAZA							Initially created for the Oglala Lakota Tribe, but never quite used for that purpose	
Namecoin	Apr 18, 2011		NMC							Allows users to register names; precursor to NFTs	
Ethereum	Jul 30, 2015	Ethereum Foundation (founded by Vitalik Buterin and others)	ETH	ETH 1.0 - PoW with Nakamoto consensus, ETH 2.0 - PoS with supermajority	Yes	No	No	ETH 1.0 Probabilistic, ETH 2.0 Economic	Account-balance		
Base	Jun 15, 2023	Coinbase	ETH	Optimistic rollup	Yes					EVM-compatible Layer-2 on Ethereum	
StarkNet	Jun 2021	StarkWare	STRK	ZK-rollup	Yes					Layer-2 on Ethereum	
Ethereum Classic	Jul 20, 2016		ETC	PoW	Yes	No	No			Split from Ethereum due to The DAO hack earlier that month	
Bitcoin Cash	Aug 1, 2017		BCH	PoW						split from Bitcoin	
Cardano	Sep 27, 2017	Charles Hoskinson and Jeremy Wood	ADA	DPoS	Yes	No	No	Probabilistic	UTXO		
TRON	Jun 24, 2018		TRON	DPoS	Yes	No					
Tezos	Jun 30, 2018	Arthur and Kathleen Breitman	XTZ	PoS	Yes	No					
Bitcoin SV	Nov 2018		BSV	PoW	Yes (scripts)	No				split from Bitcoin Cash, itself split from Bitcoin	
Lightning Network	2018		n/a	?						Layer-2 on Bitcoin	
Algorand	Jun 10, 2019	Silvio Micali and others	ALGO	PoS	Yes	No	No	Immediate			
Solana	Mar 16, 2020	Anatoly Yakovenko and Raj Gokal	SOL	PoS with Proof of History (PoH)	Yes	No	No	Immediate	Account-balance		
Polkadot	May 26, 2020	Parity Technologies	DOT	Started with PoA then moved to PoS	Yes (in parachains)	No	No		Account-balance		
Avalanche	Sep 10, 2020	Emin Gün Sirer, Maofan "Ted" Yin and Kevin Sekniqi	AVAX	PoS	Yes (in C-Chain)	No	No	Immediate	UTXO		
MobileCoin	Dec 6, 2020	MobileCoin Inc. (founded by Josh Goldbard and Shane Glynn)	MOB								
DESO	Jan 18, 2021	Nader al-Naji (aka diamondhands) and others	DESO (formerly BTCLT, CLOUT)							social media; flagship app BitClout; name acquired in Sep 2021	
Terra Classic	Apr 24, 2019	Do Kwon and others	LUNC (formerly LUNA), UST							Formerly Terra until May 2022; ecosystem collapsed in May 2022 (UST depegged to near-zero and LUNA also went to near-zero)	
Stellar	Apr 6, 2016		XLM	BFT	?	?	Yes	?			
EOS.IO	Jul 1, 2017	?	EOS	DPoS	Yes	No	?	?			
LBRY	?		LBC								
Ripple	Jun 2012	Ripple Labs	XRP	BFT	No	No	No	Immediate	Account-balance	Blockchain is known as XRP Ledger. Smart contract capabilities are being added.	
Stacks	2013		STX								
Vertcoin	Jan 8, 2014		VTC								
Hedera Hashgraph	Jul 2017		HBAR		Yes	No	Yes		Account-balance	Uses a directed acyclic graph instead of a chain per se	
Zcash	Oct 28, 2016		ZEC	PoW		Yes				uses zero-knowledge proofs for privacy	
Monero	Apr 18, 2014		XMR	PoW	No	Yes					
Bitcoin Gold	Nov 12, 2017		BTG	PoW	Yes (scripts)	No					
Dogecoin	Dec 6, 2013		DOGE	PoW	No	No					
Polygon	Jun 1, 2020	?	MATIC	PoS	Yes	No	No	Immediate	Account-balance	network anchored to Ethereum	
BNB Smart Chain (formerly Binance Smart Chain)	2017	Binance	BNB	PoS and PoA	Yes	No	Yes	Immediate	?	BNB chain is a permissioned blockchain.	
IOTA	Jul 11, 2016	IOTA Foundation	MIOTA	PoW/TaPoW	No	No	Yes	Immediate	UTXO	Smart contract capabilities are being added.	
Nano	Oct 4, 2015	Colin LeMahieu	XNO	Open Representative Voting	No	No	No	Instant (less than1 second) with deterministic finality	Account-balance		
NEAR	Sep 24, 2020	NEAR Foundation	NEAR	Started with PoA then moved to PoS	Yes	No	No	Finality	Account-balance		

== See also ==
- Category:Blockchains
- List of cryptocurrencies
