= NEAR (blockchain platform) =

Public blockchain platform

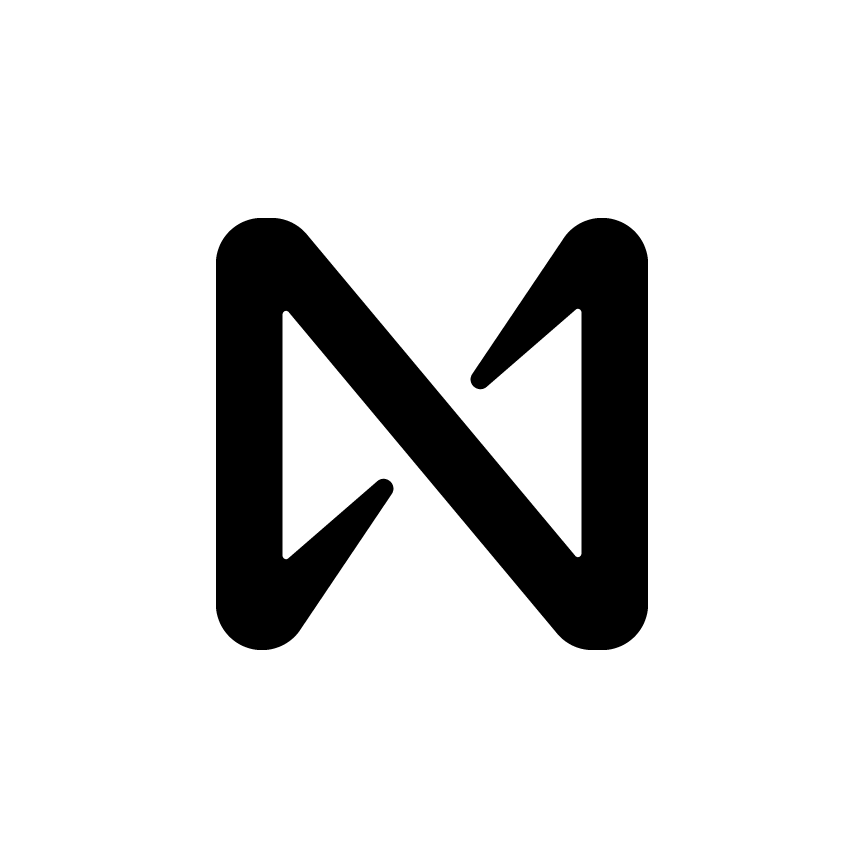

Denominations
- Code: NEAR

Development
- Original author(s): Illia Polosukhin, Alexander Skidanov
- White paper: Nightshade: Near Protocol Sharding Design 2.0
- Initial release: 2020
- Code repository: github.com/near/nearcore
- Development status: Active
- Written in: Rust
- License: Apache 2.0 OR MIT

Ledger
- Block explorer: explorer.near.org

Website
- Website: near.org

NEAR is a public blockchain platform that uses a proof-of-stake consensus mechanism and provides smart-contract functionality. Its native cryptocurrency is NEAR. It was founded in 2018 by Illia Polosukhin and Alexander Skidanov, with mainnet launching in 2020.

NEAR was designed with a sharded architecture for decentralized applications and high-throughput transactions, intended to serve as an alternative to Ethereum and other layer-one blockchain networks.

== History ==
=== Origins and founding (2017–2018) ===
NEAR Protocol was founded in early 2017 by Illia Polosukhin and Alexander Skidanov. Initially, the project was established as Near.ai, an artificial intelligence startup focused on program synthesis. Polosukhin was a former engineering manager at Google Research, where he co-authored the 2017 paper "Attention Is All You Need," which introduced the transformer architecture. Skidanov was previously the director of engineering at MemSQL and a software engineer at Microsoft.

=== Mainnet launch and funding (2019–2021) ===
The project began development on its sharded architecture in late 2018. In July 2019, NEAR raised $12.1 million in a funding round led by Metastable Capital and Accomplice.

The NEAR mainnet launched in April 2020, initially operating in a "restricted" proof of authority mode to ensure stability. In May 2020, the project closed a $21.6 million funding round led by Andreessen Horowitz.

== Criticism and controversies ==
In 2022, Skyward Finance, an IDO/launchpad built on NEAR blockchain, was exploited for roughly $3 million after an attacker abused a flaw in the project’s treasury redemption contract. The bug, identified by security firm BlockSec, failed to check for duplicate token account IDs, enabling the attacker to redeem wrapped NEAR in a loop within a single transaction. Skyward acknowledged that its treasury had been drained and advised users to cease interacting with the contracts, noting that the incident rendered the SKYWARD token effectively worthless.

In 2023, a blockchain analyst questioned validator decentralization on Avalanche, Solana, NEAR, and other blockchain platforms. A Messari study found that roughly 35% of NEAR’s staked tokens were hosted on Amazon Web Services, yielding a hosting “operational Nakamoto coefficient” of 1 (i.e., more than one-third of stake concentrated on a single provider). The report also observed geographic concentration of validators and stake in the United States and Germany, limited presence in underrepresented regions, and reliance on a single validator client at the time; taken together, NEAR’s aggregated operational Nakamoto coefficient was estimated at ~1.3, indicating elevated susceptibility to correlated infrastructure or jurisdictional failures relative to a more distributed network.

In 2024, NEAR blockchain drew criticism after its official X (formerly Twitter) account abruptly changed its display name to “it’s all a lie” and posted anti-crypto messages that prompted widespread speculation the account had been hacked. NEAR later indicated the episode was a marketing tactic tied to an upcoming event, which industry commentators and developers criticized as tone-deaf given the prevalence of genuine security breaches in the sector; some argued the stunt risked harming the project’s credibility. During the period of the campaign, Bloomberg reported that NEAR’s token declined by roughly 15% over the preceding week. Bloomberg also said that the controversy followed a real security incident in May 2023, when a compromised moderator account on NEAR’s Discord was used to promote a fraudulent airdrop.

== See also ==
- BNB Smart Chain (blockchain platform)
- Cardano (blockchain platform)
- Decentralized finance
- List of blockchains
