= BitClout =

Blockchain-based social media app

Development
- White paper: (archive)
- Initial release: March 2021; 5 years ago
- Code repository: https://github.com/bitclout/core
- Written in: Go
- Source model: Open source
- License: MIT license

Ledger
- Ledger start: 18 January 2021; 5 years ago
- Timestamping scheme: Proof of work
- Block explorer: https://explorer.deso.com/

Website
- Website: bitclout.com

BitClout was an open source blockchain-based social media platform. On the platform, users could post short-form writings and photos, award money to posts they particularly like by clicking a diamond icon, as well as buy and sell "creator coins" (personalized tokens whose value depends on people's reputations). BitClout ran on a custom proof of work blockchain, and was a prototype of what can be built on DeSo (short for "Decentralized Social"). BitClout's founder and primary leader is Nader al-Naji, known pseudonymously as "Diamondhands".

Under development since 2019, BitClout's blockchain created its first block in January 2021, and BitClout itself launched publicly in March 2021. The platform launched with 15,000 "reserved" accounts — a move intended to prevent impersonation, but which backfired as some people with reserved accounts tried to actively distance themselves. Later, in September 2021, BitClout was revealed to be the flagship product of the DeSo blockchain.

== History ==
=== Origins (2019 - March 2021) ===
In early 2019, Nader al-Naji became interested in "mixing investing and social media". He started creating a custom blockchain in May 2019, but didn't tell anyone else until November 2020. However, in the fall of 2020, al-Naji pitched BitClout's own investors under his real name and began posting job listings for a "new operation".

Although BitClout was not originally intended to launch until mid-2021, its development was sped up due to "zeitgeist about decentralized social media" in January 2021.

BitClout's first block was mined on 18 January 2021. Its next block was mined on 1 March 2021.

=== As BitClout (March - September 2021) ===
In early March 2021, about fifty investors received links to a password-protected website with the BitClout white paper. They were encouraged to explore the site and send the same link to "two or three other 'trusted contacts'". Within weeks users were spending millions of dollars per day on the platform. The platform's founders said they were "completely unprepared", having planned to have a "soft-launch". The leader went by the name "diamondhands" on the platform.

On 24 March 2021, BitClout launched out of private beta. Investors include Sequoia Capital, Andreessen Horowitz, the venture capital firm Social Capital, Coinbase Ventures, Winklevoss Capital Management, Alexis Ohanian, Polychain, Pantera, and Digital Currency Group (CoinDesk's parent company). During its initial launch, BitClout's currency could be bought with bitcoin, but not sold except on Discord servers or Twitter threads. A single bitcoin wallet related to BitClout received more than $165M worth of deposits.

In March 2021, law firm Anderson Kill P.C. sent Nader al-Naji, the presumed leader of the BitClout platform, a cease-and-desist letter, demanding the removal of Brandon Curtis's account and alleging that BitClout violated sections 1798 and 3344 of the California Civil Code by using Curtis's name and likeness without his consent. Curtis also tweeted, "Adopting Bitcoin's aesthetic to raise VC funding to carry out unethical and blatantly illegal schemes like BitClout: not cool". (However, Curtis's coin, despite not being listed on the official website, can still be bought by users searching for the original username.) Additionally, in April 2021, Lee Hsien Loong asked for his name and photograph to be removed from the site, stating that he has "nothing to do with the platform" and that "it is misleading and done without [his] permission".

On 18 May 2021, diamondhands announced that 100% of the BitClout code went public.

On 12 June 2021, the supply of BitClout was capped at around 11 million coins.

On 18 July 2021, BitClout added the ability for users to mint and purchase NFTs within the platform.

=== As part of DeSo (September 2021 - July 2024) ===
On 21 September 2021, it was revealed that BitClout was a prototype built on DeSo, short for "Decentralized Social". As a part of this revelation, diamondhands confirmed his identity as Nader al-Naji. (As early as April 2021, it had been believed that diamondhands indeed was that person.)The Bitclout project raised $200M in funding, which went to setting up the DeSo Foundation.

=== End and aftermath (July 2024 - present) ===
In July 2024, al-Naji was arrested by the FBI and charged with wire fraud involving BitClout. He also faced civil charges of securities fraud and unregistered offers and sales of securities from the Securities and Exchange Commission. In response, the official "deso" account posted that al-Naji was "safe and at home" and "that this experience has only reinforced [his] commitment to DeSo". In February 2025, the Justice Department dropped its case against al-Naji. In March 2026, the SEC voluntarily dismissed the enforcement case with prejudice.

== Design ==
BitClout is a social media platform. Its users can post short-form writings and photos (similarly to Twitter). They can award money to posts they particularly like by clicking a diamond icon (similarly to Twitch Bits).

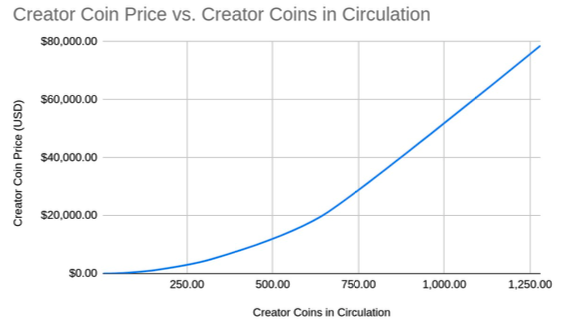

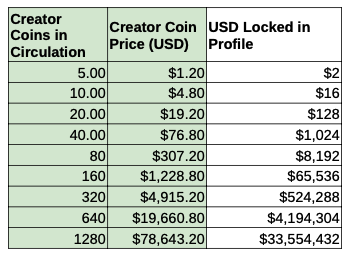
Top: graph of the BitClout creator coin price curve. Bottom: a tabulated version of the same.

The prices of each account's "creator coin" goes up and down with the popularity of the celebrity behind it. For example, if someone says something negative, the value of their corresponding account may go down. This price is computed automatically according to the formula $price\_in\_bitclout=.003*creator\_coins\_in\_circulation^2$.

At launch time, BitClout scraped 15,000 profiles of celebrities from Twitter to create "reserved" accounts in their names. To claim a reserved account, the account holder would need to tweet about it (which also serves as a marketing strategy). At least 80 such reserved profiles have been claimed.

Proof of stake was introduced in March 2024.
