= MZC =

MZC may refer to:

- Mirza Cheuki railway station, a railway station in India with the code MZC
- MazaCoin, a crypto with the code MZC
- IATA code MZC, which is assigned to Mitzic Airport in Gabon
- Minimum zone circle, a roundness error, see Roundness error definitions
- Mozambique Current, which is sometimes shortened to MZC
