= Cosmos (network) =

Ledger software platform

Development
- White paper: Cosmos: A Network of Distributed Ledgers
- Developer: Interchain Foundation

Website
- Website: https://cosmos.network

Cosmos is a blockchain ledger software platform designed to enable the creation of application-specific, distributed ledgers that can communicate and transfer data across each other. The project is supported by the Interchain Foundation (Interchain Stiftung), a Swiss foundation registered in Zug, Switzerland, established in 2017 to fund open-source blockchain development, and developed by its subsidiary Cosmos Labs.

== History ==
The Cosmos project was initiated in 2014 by Jae Kwon, who developed the Tendermint consensus algorithm. Ethan Buchman joined the project in 2015. In 2016, they published the white paper "Cosmos: A Network of Distributed Ledgers", which proposed a network of independent blockchains connected through the Inter-Blockchain Communication (IBC) protocol.

In April 2017, the Interchain Foundation conducted a token sale that raised approximately $17 million. The foundation is legally registered as Interchain Stiftung in the Canton of Zug, supervised by the Swiss Federal Foundation Supervisory Authority (Eidgenossische Stiftungsaufsicht).

The Cosmos Hub mainnet was launched on 13 March 2019. In 2021, the IBC protocol was introduced, enabling interoperability between independent blockchains.

In February 2022, All in Bits Inc. (operating as Tendermint Inc.) rebranded to Ignite. In February 2023, the Tendermint Core consensus software was forked and renamed CometBFT, maintained as an open-source project.

== Technology ==
The Cosmos stack refers to a set of open-source tools and protocols for building application-specific and interoperable blockchains. It includes a modular development framework (Cosmos SDK), a consensus engine (CometBFT), interoperability protocols such as the Inter-Blockchain Communication Protocol (IBC), and support for different execution environments and application-specific modules. Extensions to the stack include compatibility layers such as Cosmos EVM, as well as shared security mechanisms such as Interchain Security, which allows blockchains to leverage validator sets from other networks.

Cosmos uses a proof-of-stake consensus mechanism based on the CometBFT Byzantine Fault Tolerance (BFT) engine, formerly known as Tendermint. The academic paper, "The latest gossip on BFT consensus" by Buchman, Kwon, and Milosevic (2018), presented the protocol's formal specification. A 2025 study provided a universally composable security analysis demonstrating the protocol's resilience against strategic message-delay attacks.

The Cosmos SDK is framework for building application-specific blockchains and components customization. Blockchains built with the Cosmos SDK can interoperate via the IBC protocol, which enables the exchange of data and tokens without a central intermediary.

Bloomberg described the Cosmos Hub in 2022 as a blockchain creation platform underlying high-profile projects.

In 2022, decentralized derivatives exchange dYdX announced it would migrate from Ethereum to a dedicated Cosmos-based blockchain, with the new chain launching in October 2023.
