= Kyle Roche =

American attorney (born 1987)

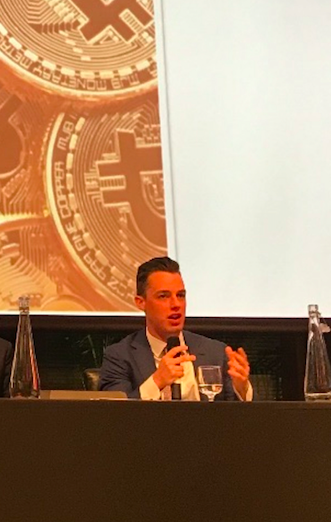
- Roche in 2022
- Born: Kyle William Roche; October 30, 1987 (age 38); Amherst, New York, U.S.
- Education: Purdue University (BS); Northwestern University (JD)
- Occupations: Attorney; real estate developer; philanthropist
- Political party: Democratic
- Spouse: Kaylin Marcotte (m. 2024)
- Children: 2
- Website: rochedevelopment.co

Kyle Roche (born October 30, 1987) is an American attorney and real estate developer from Amherst, New York. He co-owns the real estate development company Roche Development, which handles properties within the Allentown Historic District of Buffalo, New York.

In October 2022, Roche resigned from the Roche Freedman law firm, which he originally co-founded, following targeted lawsuits that garnered controversial reception. The firm was later rebranded to Freedman Normand Friedland, and Roche rejoined the firm in July 2024.

== Early life and education ==
Kyle Roche grew up in Amherst, New York, son of Kari (née Meyers) and William Roche. His paternal grandfather was Commodore of the Buffalo Yacht Club. He is the oldest of four siblings, who all attended parochial school at Saints Peter & Paul Church in Williamsville, New York. Roche graduated from Canisius High School, where he was accepted after a personal recommendation by National Fuel chief executive officer Bernard Kennedy. The Evans Scholars Foundation awarded Roche a college scholarship in recognition of his work caddying at the Country Club of Buffalo.

Roche attended Purdue University and earned a bachelor's degree in chemical engineering, later earning his Juris Doctor from Northwestern University Pritzker School of Law. While attending Northwestern University in 2013, he began investing in cryptocurrency. He co-authored Bitcoin: Order without Law in the Digital Age with professor John McGinnis in March 2017, an academic paper that argued Bitcoin was resistant to state control. Roche and McGinnis also co-authored a July 2017 op-ed in The Wall Street Journal, where they argued the strength of Bitcoin against fiat currency.

== Career ==
=== Law ===
While an associate at Boies Schiller Flexner LLP, Roche began representing the estate of Dave Kleiman in its lawsuit against Craig Steven Wright. Wright had publicly claimed to be Satoshi Nakamoto, the anonymous inventor of Bitcoin. Roche and co-worker Devin Freedman hoped to verify Wright's claim through discovery, and they left to start their own law firm in August 2019. Emin Gün Sirer commissioned Roche to work for him in September 2019, paying Roche in cryptocurrency from his startup platform Avalanche, along with an equity stake in the company.

In April 2020, Roche Cyrulnik Freedman began filing class action lawsuits against cryptocurrency exchanges and token issuers for selling unregistered securities. Jason Cyrulnik sued Roche and Freedman in March 2021 after being fired from the firm, claiming he was owed $60 million of their Avalanche shares. As part of the discovery process, Roche and Freedman's shares in Avalanche were publicly disclosed. The blockchain company Dfinity was sued by Roche Freedman in August 2021. Roche Freedman won a $100 million judgement for the estate of Dave Kleiman in December 2021. Roche unveiled Ryval in January 2022, his crowdfunding platform for legal financing. He spoke at the OffshoreAlert conference in April 2022, participating in panel discussions on the topics of legal financing, Nexo, and Tether.

The jury just listens to the story. The fact that ten idiots control the flow of all the money that happens in American class actions, every case – that is what makes the practice of law.

— Kyle Roche

Footage of a January 2022 meeting between Roche and Christen Ager-Hanssen was published by Crypto Leaks in August 2022, featuring Roche admitting that he had targeted rivals of Avalanche with lawsuits. The London, England meeting and its recording were later revealed to have been orchestrated by Dfinity. Ager-Hanssen had misrepresented himself to Roche as a potential investor in Ryval. Roche attempted to mitigate the scandal by withdrawing from his firm's ongoing suits, but judge Katherine Polk Failla removed Roche Freedman as a whole from its pending cases against Bitfinex and Tether. He resigned from Roche Freedman in October 2022, and the firm rebranded that same month as Freedman Normand Friedland.

Roche and Kelvin Goode co-founded ClaimsHero in January 2023, an online platform used to recruit plaintiffs for class action lawsuits against companies such as TikTok. He won a $12.5 million judgment against Cantor Fitzgerald in April 2023 on behalf of their former partners, but it was later overturned in Delaware Supreme Court. Freedman Normand Friedland was removed from its lawsuit against Dfinity in May 2023, with judge James Donato rejecting the firm's claim that Dfinity had doctored their leaked video of Roche. Jason Cyrulnik's lawsuit against Freedman Normand Friedland was settled out-of-court in June 2024. Freedman Normand Friedland rehired Roche in July 2024.

Zachary Young was represented by Roche in his defamation lawsuit against CNN for their coverage of the 2021 Kabul airlift, and was awarded a $5 million judgement in January 2025. Roche also won his father William Roche a $10 million judgment against PSE Archery in May 2025, after one of their compound bows malfunctioned and left him blind in one eye.

=== Real estate ===
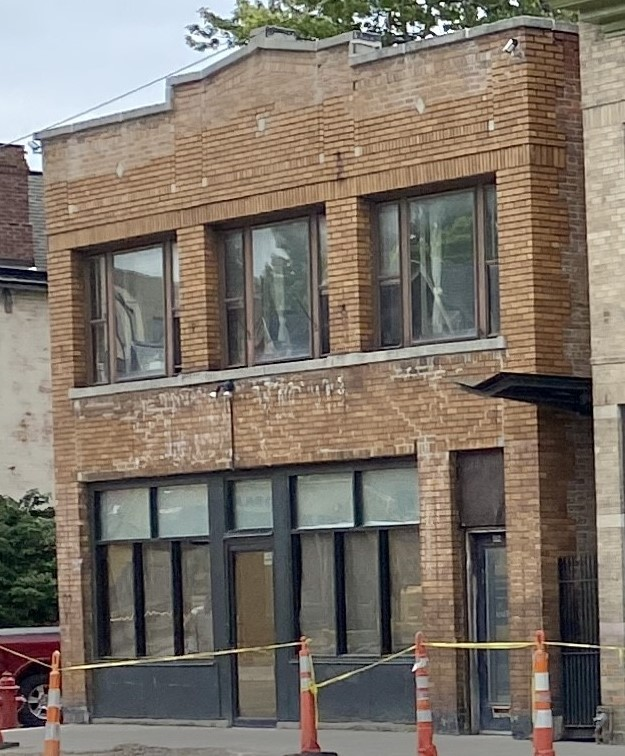
162 Allen Street, Roche's Allentown Historic District building

Roche Development is a real estate development company in Clarence, New York that is co-owned by Roche and his father, William Roche. Its portfolio comprises significant properties within the Allentown Historic District of Buffalo, New York. This includes a stretch of Allen Street previously occupied by Mulligan's Brick Bar and The Old Pink, where the company plans on constructing a mixed-use building.

The company acquired 162 Allen Street for $765,000 in June 2022, a commercial building with secondary suite in the Allentown Historic District of Buffalo, New York. It was built in 1880, and had its original façade restored during a 2013 renovation. The storefront is currently leased by Dalfonso's Italian Imports.

A mixed-use building will be constructed by the company on land they own at the corner of Allen Street and Mariner Street within Buffalo's Allentown Historic District. The vacant lots were purchased for $380,000 in August 2025, and were previously occupied by Mulligan's Brick Bar and The Old Pink. The Old Pink was destroyed by arson in June 2024, and Mulligan's Brick Bar was destroyed by a separate fire in January 2025. A former parking lot between the two properties is owned by the city of Buffalo, and will be sold to Roche Development upon approval from the city's preservation board.

The company holds venture capital investments in Cerebras, Gopuff, and Palantir Technologies.

=== Philanthropy ===
He is a philanthropist and has served on the board of directors for Roswell Park Alliance Foundation since September 2025.

Roche funded the September 2025 opening of a Montessori program within the parochial school of his alma mater Saints Peter & Paul Church in Williamsville, New York.

== Personal life ==
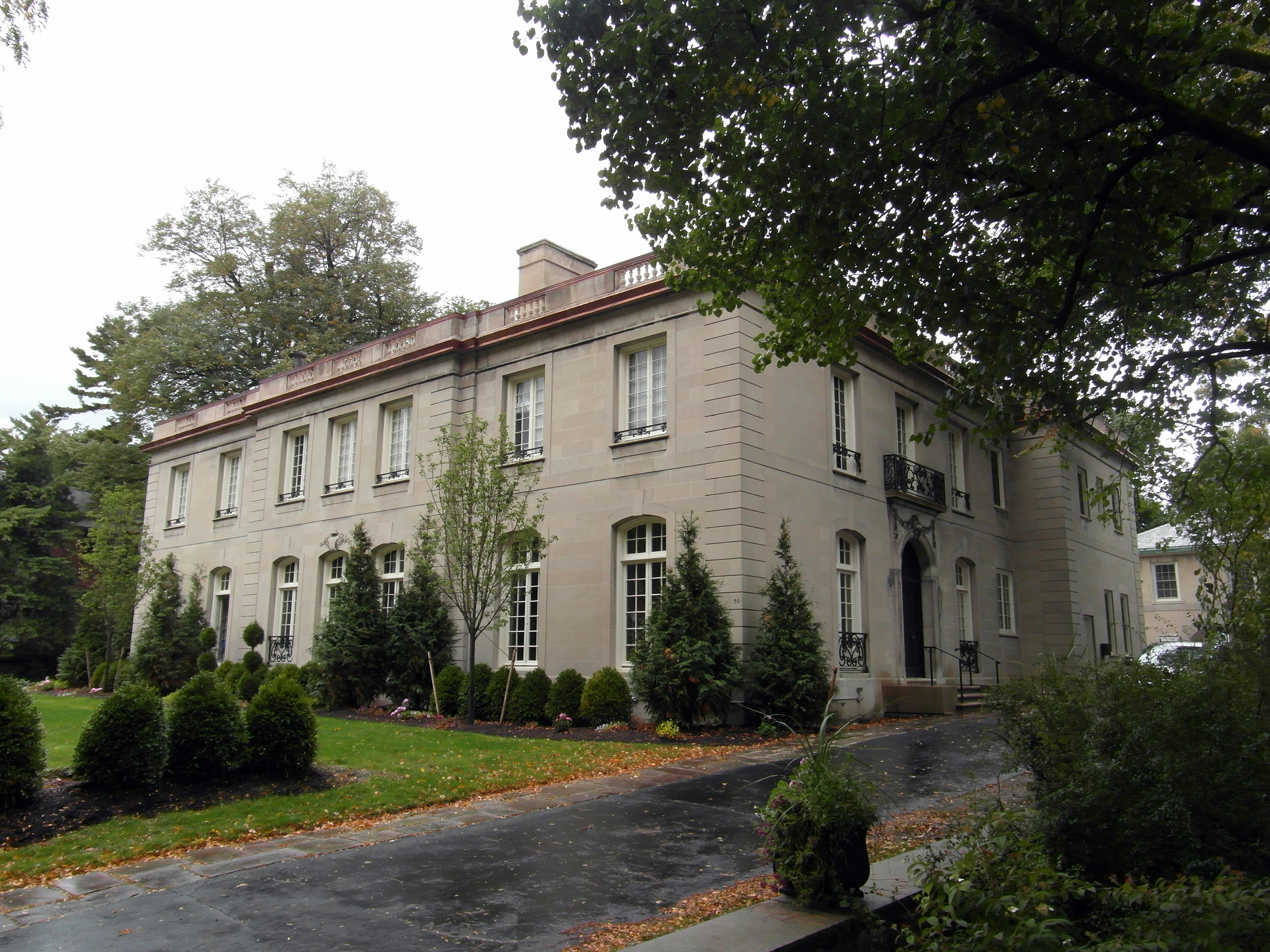
50 Tudor Place, Roche's Elmwood Historic District mansion

Roche married Kaylin Marcotte in a September 2024 ceremony at St. Joseph Cathedral in Buffalo, New York. Marcotte is the founder of jigsaw puzzle company Jiggy, which famously won funding from Mark Cuban during her appearance on the 12th season of Shark Tank. The couple have two children and reside in Miami Beach, Florida.

He and his wife purchased 50 Tudor Place, a Buffalo mansion within the city's Elmwood Historic District, for $3.5 million in March 2025. It was built in 1927 for pharmaceutical mogul Orin Foster, and designed by Harlow C. Curtiss Building architect Paul F. Mann. Included with their purchase was an adjacent lot at 43 St. Catherines Court. The real estate transaction was the highest ever recorded in Buffalo’s history, and the couple use the mansion as a summer home.

Roche is a practicing Catholic. He is also an ordained minister of the Universal Life Church, and officiated the August 2018 wedding of William Clayman and Joshua Handell at The Yale Club of New York City.

His sister Serena Roche is a student at Benjamin N. Cardozo School of Law, where she is editor-in-chief of the Cardozo Journal of Equal Rights and Social Justice. Their twin brothers Kory Roche and Kreig Roche are both intellectually disabled.

A registered Democrat, Roche is listed by OpenSecrets as having donated to the 2020 United States Senate campaign of Theresa Greenfield, and the 2022 California State Assembly campaign of Sara Aminzadeh.
