= Avalanche (blockchain platform) =

Blockchain platform

Denominations
- Code: AVAX

Development
- White paper: www.avalabs.org/products#whitepapers
- Initial release: 21 September 2020; 6 years ago
- Code repository: github.com/ava-labs/avalanchego
- Development status: Active
- Developers: Ava Labs; Avalanche Foundation
- Source model: Open source

Ledger
- Block explorer: explorer.avax.network
- Supply limit: 720,000,000 AVAX

Website
- Website: www.avalanche.com

Avalanche is a public proof-of-stake blockchain platform for smart contracts and custom blockchains. It was launched in September 2020 by Ava Labs, an American company co-founded by the computer scientist Emin Gün Sirer. Its native cryptocurrency is AVAX.

At its core, Avalanche's Primary Network runs three interconnected blockchains: one for exchanging assets, one for smart contracts and one for coordinating validators. Developers can also launch their own independent chains, known as Avalanche Layer-1s (L1s). Rather than having every validator talk to every other, Avalanche reaches agreement through the Snow family of protocols, in which each validator repeatedly polls a small, random, stake-weighted sample of its peers.

The supply of AVAX is capped at 720 million tokens, and transaction fees are burned rather than paid out. In 2026, the first U.S.-listed spot AVAX exchange-traded fund began trading, and U.S. regulators named AVAX as an example of a digital commodity rather than a security.

== History ==
The Avalanche consensus protocol was first described in May 2018, in a whitepaper published under the pseudonym "Team Rocket". Researchers at Cornell University, including Sirer, later expanded on it. Sirer and two doctoral students then founded Ava Labs to develop the technology for the financial industry. A separate organization, the Avalanche Foundation, supports the growth of the network's ecosystem.

Avalanche's first public token sale, in July 2020, raised $42 million in under five hours. In September 2021, the Avalanche Foundation raised a further $230 million by selling AVAX privately to investors led by Polychain Capital and Three Arrows Capital. By November 2021, AVAX had become the tenth most valuable cryptocurrency by market value.

In August 2022, an anonymous website called Crypto Leaks published videos of lawyer Kyle Roche and alleged that Ava Labs had a secret arrangement with his law firm, Roche Freedman, to bring lawsuits against Avalanche's competitors. Ava Labs CEO Emin Gün Sirer and Roche Freedman denied the allegations.

The Avalanche9000 upgrade, built around the Etna network upgrade, went live on 16 December 2024. It replaced the requirement that L1 validators also stake 2,000 AVAX on the Primary Network with an ongoing fee, lowering the cost of launching an L1. The Granite upgrade of 19 November 2025 introduced dynamic block times on the C-Chain, allowing blocks to be produced in under a second. The Helicon upgrade followed on 22 September 2026, changing staking rules and how the C-Chain executes transactions.

In April 2025, according to The New York Times, Ava Labs donated $1 million to Make America Great Again Inc.; around the same time, the company's president, John Wu, attended a private fundraising reception with Donald Trump. In August 2025, Anthony Scaramucci announced that his firm, SkyBridge Capital, would put $300 million, 10% of its funds under management, into tokenized assets on Avalanche. In October 2025, investors led by Bart Smith, a former crypto executive at Susquehanna, announced plans for a $675 million company dedicated to accumulating AVAX.

Several organizations launched their own Avalanche L1s in 2025. Nexon's Henesys chain hosted the launch of MapleStory N in May, and FIFA announced its own FIFA Blockchain the same month.

On 26 January 2026, VanEck launched the first U.S.-listed spot Avalanche exchange-traded fund (ETF), which trades on Nasdaq. Wyoming's Frontier Stable Token (FRNT), the first stablecoin issued by a U.S. state, is issued on several blockchains, including Avalanche; it launched in August 2025 and went on public sale in January 2026. Also in January 2026, the music-royalties company Record Financial partnered with Ava Labs to record music rights and royalty payments on Avalanche, aiming to create a shared ledger for registrations and payments.

On 17 March 2026, the U.S. Securities and Exchange Commission (SEC) and the Commodity Futures Trading Commission (CFTC) issued a joint interpretation naming 16 cryptocurrencies, including AVAX, Bitcoin and Ether, as examples of "digital commodities" rather than securities.

== Design ==
Avalanche is a network of many blockchains, each of which can be tailored to a different application. At its center is the Primary Network, itself an Avalanche L1, which runs three interoperable blockchains: the Exchange Chain (X-Chain), the Contract Chain (C-Chain), and the Platform Chain (P-Chain). These chains are used for asset transfers, smart-contract execution, and validator coordination, respectively. Chains, including independent L1s, exchange messages through Avalanche Interchain Messaging (ICM).

=== X-Chain ===
The X-Chain, which runs the Avalanche Virtual Machine (AVM), is used to create and transfer digital assets called Avalanche Native Tokens. These can represent real-world assets such as equity or bonds and can carry their own rules; AVAX itself is traded on the X-Chain. Like Bitcoin, it tracks balances with the unspent transaction output (UTXO) model.

The X-Chain originally ran the DAG-based Avalanche consensus protocol, which only partially orders transactions. The 2023 Cortina upgrade converted it into a conventional linear chain running Snowman++.

=== P-Chain ===
The P-Chain, which runs the Platform Virtual Machine (PlatformVM), is the network's coordination layer. It keeps track of validators, delegators, uptime and staking rewards, and it is used to create new blockchains and L1s and to manage their validator sets.

Since the Etna upgrade, L1 validators no longer need to validate the Primary Network; instead, they pay the P-Chain a continuous fee.

=== C-Chain ===
The C-Chain is an implementation of the Ethereum Virtual Machine (EVM). It supports smart contracts written in Solidity. Instead of Ethereum's consensus protocol, however, it uses Avalanche's Snowman consensus.

== Consensus ==
Earlier blockchain consensus protocols fall broadly into two families. Classical Byzantine fault tolerant (BFT) protocols such as PBFT reach fast, final decisions, but every participant must be known, and at least one node must process data in proportion to the number of participants for each decision, which limits how far the network can grow. Nakamoto consensus, used by Bitcoin, relies on proof of work and the longest-chain rule. It supports a large, open set of participants, but its finality is only probabilistic, since blocks can later be dropped from the chain, and its constant computation consumes considerable energy.

Avalanche's Snow protocols take a different approach, known as repeated random subsampling: instead of contacting the whole network, a node repeatedly polls a small, random set of validators. The protocols need no leader, and each node processes at most a logarithmic amount of data per decision.

=== Snow protocol family ===
The protocol paper builds up the family in stages, each adding to the last. All of them rely on metastability: small, random imbalances in preference reinforce themselves until the whole network settles on a single option.

- Slush: each node queries k random nodes and adopts an option as its preference if at least α of the responses favor it. Slush is not Byzantine fault tolerant and serves only to illustrate the idea.
- Snowflake: adds a counter of consecutive successful queries; a node decides once the counter reaches the threshold β.
- Snowball: adds cumulative confidence counters for each option, so that a node's preference is not changed by short-lived fluctuations.
- Avalanche: applies Snowball to a DAG of transactions. A vote for a transaction also counts as a vote for its ancestors in the DAG (transitive voting), allowing non-conflicting transactions to be processed together without a total order.

Snowman is the variant for linear chains, which smart contracts require. The C-Chain, the P-Chain and Avalanche L1s run Snowman++, an extension of Snowman; since Cortina, the X-Chain does as well.

=== Operation ===
To decide on a block, a node samples k validators at random, weighted by stake, and asks which block they prefer. If at least α of the responses name the same block, it becomes the node's preference; once the same block wins β consecutive polls, it is accepted. Because the number of messages per query does not depend on the number of validators, the protocol scales to thousands of validators. When there is nothing to decide, nodes stop polling; proof-of-work systems, by contrast, compute continuously.

Safety is probabilistic: by tuning the parameters, the chance that two honest nodes reach different decisions on the same transaction can be made arbitrarily small. Raising α lets the protocol stay safe with more malicious participants, but it also means fewer of them are needed to stall its progress (liveness). Unlike in Nakamoto consensus, accepted blocks are never later reversed, and Ava Labs says blocks are accepted in about one second. In a large-scale test reported in the protocol paper, the system processed about 3,400 transactions per second, confirming them in 1.35 seconds.

To stop a single actor from dominating the random samples by running many nodes (a Sybil attack), Avalanche uses proof of stake: a validator's chance of being polled is proportional to the amount of AVAX it has staked.

== Tokenomics ==
The supply of AVAX is capped at 720 million tokens. Half of that, 360 million AVAX, was created when the network launched; the rest is released gradually as staking rewards. Rewards are minted on the P-Chain when a validator completes its staking period. Because the amount minted is proportional to how much of the cap remains, new issuance slows as supply approaches 720 million.

Transaction fees on the X-, P- and C-Chains, and on L1s that charge fees in AVAX, are burned (permanently destroyed) rather than paid to validators. Newly minted rewards offset these burns. Burning does not free up room under the cap, so the most AVAX that can ever circulate is 720 million minus everything burned, which is why market-data sites list a maximum supply below 720 million.
