= Byzantine fault =

Fault in a computer system that presents different symptoms to different observers

A Byzantine fault is a condition of a system, particularly a distributed computing system, where a fault occurs such that different symptoms are presented to different observers, including imperfect information on whether a system component has failed. The term takes its name from an allegory, the "Byzantine generals problem", developed to describe a situation in which, to avoid catastrophic failure of a system, the system's actors must agree on a strategy, but some of these actors are unreliable in a way which causes other (good) actors to disagree on the strategy and they may be unaware of the disagreement.

A Byzantine fault is also known as a Byzantine generals problem, a Byzantine agreement problem, or a Byzantine failure.

Byzantine fault tolerance (BFT) is the resilience of a fault-tolerant computer system or similar system to such conditions.

== Definition ==
A Byzantine fault is any fault presenting different symptoms to different observers. A Byzantine failure is the loss of a system service due to a Byzantine fault in systems that require consensus among multiple components.

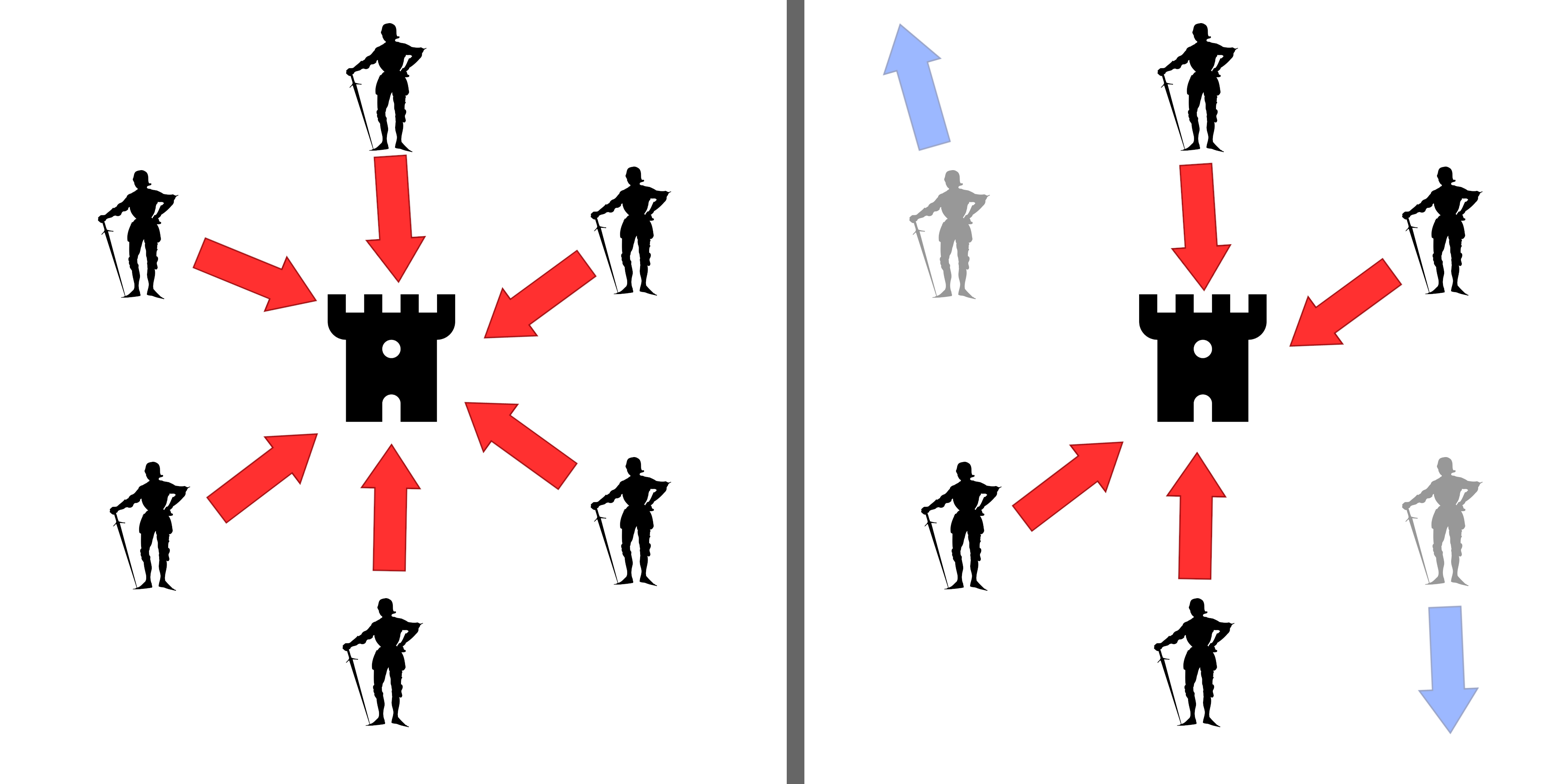
If all generals attack in coordination, the battle is won (left). If two generals falsely declare that they intend to attack, but instead retreat, the battle is lost (right).

The Byzantine allegory considers a number of generals who are attacking a fortress. The generals must decide as a group whether to attack or retreat; some may prefer to attack, while others prefer to retreat. The important thing is that all generals agree on a common decision, for a half-hearted attack by a few generals would become a rout, and would be worse than either a coordinated attack or a coordinated retreat.

The problem is complicated by the presence of treacherous generals who may not only cast a vote for a suboptimal strategy; they may do so selectively. For instance, if nine generals are voting, four of whom support attacking while four others are in favor of retreat, the ninth general may send a vote of retreat to those generals in favor of retreat, and a vote of attack to the rest. Those who received a retreat vote from the ninth general will retreat, while the rest will attack (which may not go well for the attackers). The problem is complicated further by the generals being physically separated and having to send their votes via messengers who may fail to deliver votes or may forge false votes.

Without message signing, Byzantine fault tolerance can only be achieved if the total number of generals is greater than three times the number of disloyal (faulty) generals. There can be a default vote value given to missing messages. For example, missing messages can be given a "null" value. Further, if the agreement is that the null votes are in the majority, a pre-assigned default strategy can be used (e.g., retreat).

The typical mapping of this allegory onto computer systems is that the computers are the generals and their digital communication system links are the messengers. Although the problem is formulated in the allegory as a decision-making and security problem, in electronics, it cannot be solved by cryptographic digital signatures alone, because failures such as incorrect voltages can propagate through the encryption process. Thus, a faulty message could be sent such that some recipients detect the message as faulty (bad signature), others see it as having a good signature, and a third group also sees a good signature but with different message contents than the second group.

== History ==
The problem of obtaining Byzantine consensus was conceived and formalized by Robert Shostak, who dubbed it the interactive consistency problem. This work was done in 1978 in the context of the NASA-sponsored SIFT project in the Computer Science Lab at SRI International. SIFT (for Software Implemented Fault Tolerance) was the brainchild of John Wensley, and was based on the idea of using multiple general-purpose computers that would communicate through pairwise messaging in order to reach a consensus, even if some of the computers were faulty.

At the beginning of the project, it was not clear how many computers in total were needed to guarantee that a conspiracy of n faulty computers could not "thwart" the efforts of the correctly-operating ones to reach consensus. Shostak showed that a minimum of 3n+1 are needed, and devised a two-round 3n+1 messaging protocol that would work for n=1. His colleague Marshall Pease generalized the algorithm for any n > 0, proving that 3n+1 is both necessary and sufficient. These results, together with a later proof by Leslie Lamport of the sufficiency of 3n using digital signatures, were published in the seminal paper, Reaching Agreement in the Presence of Faults. The authors were awarded the 2005 Edsger W. Dijkstra Prize for this paper.

To make the interactive consistency problem easier to understand, Lamport devised a colorful allegory in which a group of army generals formulate a plan for attacking a city. In its original version, the story cast the generals as commanders of the Albanian army. The name was changed, eventually settling on "Byzantine", at the suggestion of Jack Goldberg to future-proof any potential offense-giving. This formulation of the problem, together with some additional results, were presented by the same authors in their 1982 paper, "The Byzantine Generals Problem".

== Mitigation ==
The objective of Byzantine fault tolerance is to be able to defend against failures of system components with or without symptoms that prevent other components of the system from reaching an agreement among themselves, where such an agreement is needed for the correct operation of the system.

The remaining operationally correct components of a Byzantine fault tolerant system will be able to continue providing the system's service as originally intended, assuming there are a sufficient number of accurately-operating components to maintain the service.

When considering failure propagation only via errors, Byzantine failures are considered the most general and most difficult class of failures among the failure modes. The so-called fail-stop failure mode occupies the simplest end of the spectrum. Whereas the fail-stop failure mode simply means that the only way to fail is a node crash, detected by other nodes, Byzantine failures imply no restrictions on what errors can be created, which means that a failed node can generate arbitrary data, including data that makes it appear like a functioning node to a subset of other nodes. Thus, Byzantine failures can confuse failure detection systems, which makes fault tolerance difficult. Despite the allegory, a Byzantine failure is not necessarily a security problem involving hostile human interference: it can arise purely from physical or software faults.

The terms fault and failure are used here according to the standard definitions originally created by a joint committee on "Fundamental Concepts and Terminology" formed by the IEEE Computer Society's Technical Committee on Dependable Computing and Fault-Tolerance and IFIP Working Group 10.4 on Dependable Computing and Fault Tolerance. See also dependability.

Byzantine fault tolerance is only concerned with broadcast consistency, that is, the property that when a component broadcasts a value to all the other components, they all receive exactly this same value, or in the case that the broadcaster is not consistent, the other components agree on a common value themselves. This kind of fault tolerance does not encompass the correctness of the value itself; for example, an adversarial component that deliberately sends an incorrect value, but sends that same value consistently to all components, will not be caught in the Byzantine fault tolerance scheme.

== Solutions ==
Several early solutions were described by Lamport, Shostak, and Pease in 1982. They began by noting that the Generals' Problem can be reduced to solving a "Commander and Lieutenants" problem where loyal Lieutenants must all act in unison and that their action must correspond to what the Commander ordered in the case that the Commander is loyal:

- One solution considers scenarios in which messages may be forged, but which will be Byzantine-fault-tolerant as long as the number of disloyal generals is less than one third of the generals. The impossibility of dealing with one-third or more traitors ultimately reduces to proving that the one Commander and two Lieutenants problem cannot be solved, if the Commander is traitorous. To see this, suppose we have a traitorous Commander A, and two Lieutenants, B and C: when A tells B to attack and C to retreat, and B and C send messages to each other, forwarding A's message, neither B nor C can figure out who is the traitor, since it is not necessarily A—the other Lieutenant could have forged the message purportedly from A. It can be shown that if n is the number of generals in total, and t is the number of traitors in that n, then there are solutions to the problem only when n > 3t and the communication is synchronous (bounded delay). The full set of BFT requirements are: For F number of Byzantine failures, there needs to be at least 3F+1 players (fault containment zones), 2F+1 independent communication paths, and F+1 rounds of communication. There can be hybrid fault models in which benign (non-Byzantine) faults as well as Byzantine faults may exist simultaneously. For each additional benign fault that must be tolerated, the above numbers need to be incremented by one. If the BFT rounds of communication do not exist, Byzantine failures can occur even with no faulty hardware.
- A second solution requires unforgeable message signatures. Digital signatures can provide Byzantine fault tolerance in the presence of an arbitrary number of traitorous generals provided that n > F+1 (the problem becomes vacuous otherwise). In particular, one Commander and two Lieutenants can reach consensus in the presence of a single traitor since the traitor cannot impersonate others. Solutions based on other cryptographic primitives such as Message Authentication Codes (MACs) were developed later.
- Also presented is a variation on the first two solutions allowing Byzantine-fault-tolerant behavior in some situations where not all generals can communicate directly with each other.

There are many systems that claim BFT without meeting the above minimum requirements (e.g., blockchain). Given that there is mathematical proof that this is impossible, these claims need to include a caveat that their definition of BFT strays from the original. That is, systems such as blockchain don't guarantee agreement. They use resource-intensive mechanisms that make disagreements impractical to maintain.

Several system architectures were designed c. 1980 that implemented Byzantine fault tolerance. These include: Draper's FTMP, Honeywell's MMFCS, and SRI's SIFT.

In 1999, Miguel Castro and Barbara Liskov introduced the "Practical Byzantine Fault Tolerance" (PBFT) algorithm, which provides high-performance Byzantine state machine replication, processing thousands of requests per second with sub-millisecond increases in latency.

After PBFT, several BFT protocols were introduced to improve its robustness and performance. For instance, Q/U, HQ, Zyzzyva, and ABsTRACTs, addressed the performance and cost issues; whereas other protocols, like Aardvark and RBFT, addressed its robustness issues. Furthermore, Adapt tried to make use of existing BFT protocols, through switching between them in an adaptive way, to improve system robustness and performance as the underlying conditions change. Furthermore, BFT protocols were introduced that leverage trusted components to reduce the number of replicas, e.g., A2M-PBFT-EA and MinBFT.

Recent research addresses the scalability limits of traditional BFT implementations (which often incur $O(n^2)$ communication complexity) by parallelizing consensus. For example, the Cerberus protocol maps data to a large, fixed state space to couple consensus instances with specific transaction sets. This allows BFT processes to run independently in parallel, enabling linear scalability relative to the network size.

== Applications ==
Several examples of Byzantine failures that have occurred are given in two equivalent journal papers. These and other examples are described on the NASA DASHlink web pages.

=== Applications in computing ===
Byzantine fault tolerance mechanisms use components that repeat an incoming message (or just its signature, which can be reduced to just a single bit of information if self-checking pairs are used for nodes) to other recipients of that incoming message. All these mechanisms make the assumption that the act of repeating a message blocks the propagation of Byzantine symptoms. For systems that have a high degree of safety or security criticality, these assumptions must be proven to be true to an acceptable level of fault coverage. When providing proof through testing, one difficulty is creating a sufficiently wide range of signals with Byzantine symptoms. Such testing will likely require specialized fault injectors.

=== Military applications ===
Byzantine errors were observed infrequently and at irregular points during endurance testing for the newly constructed Virginia-class submarine, at least through 2005 (when the issues were publicly reported).

=== Cryptocurrency applications ===
The Bitcoin network works in parallel to generate a blockchain with proof of work allowing the system to overcome Byzantine failures and reach a coherent global view of the system's state. Some proof of stake blockchains also use BFT algorithms.

=== Blockchain ===
Byzantine fault tolerance is a crucial concept in blockchain technology, ensuring that a network can continue to function even when some nodes (participants) fail or act maliciously. This tolerance is necessary because blockchains are decentralized systems with no central authority, making it essential to achieve consensus among nodes, even if some try to disrupt the process.

=== Artificial Intelligence ===
Ensuring that an AI system behaves reliably and as intended, especially in the presence of unexpected faults or adversarial conditions, is a complex challenge. By accepting that components may fail, and further that frontier AI models may deceive, Byzantine fault tolerance has been proposed as an approach towards AI safety. Structuring AI systems as ensembles of AI artifacts or modules that check and balance each other leads to strong assurances that no single errant or deceptive component can easily steer the system into an unsafe state.

==== Applications and examples ====
Safety mechanisms
Different blockchains use various BFT-based consensus mechanisms like Practical Byzantine Fault Tolerance (PBFT), Tendermint, Delegated Proof of Stake (DPoS), and Avalanche consensus to handle Byzantine faults. These protocols ensure that the majority of honest nodes can agree on the next block in the chain, securing the network against attacks and preventing double-spending and other types of fraud. Practical examples of networks include Hyperledger Fabric, Cosmos, Klever and Avalanche in this sequence.
51% attack mitigation
While traditional blockchains like Bitcoin use proof of work (PoW), which is susceptible to a 51% attack, BFT-based systems are designed to tolerate up to one-third of faulty or malicious nodes without compromising the network's integrity.
Decentralized trust
Byzantine fault tolerance underpins the trust model in decentralized networks. Instead of relying on a central authority, the network's security depends on the ability of honest nodes to outnumber and outmaneuver malicious ones.
Private and permissioned blockchains
BFT is especially important in private or permissioned blockchains, where a limited number of known participants need to reach a consensus quickly and securely. These networks often use BFT protocols to enhance performance and security.

=== In aviation ===
Some aircraft systems, such as the Boeing 777 Aircraft Information Management System (via its ARINC 659 SAFEbus network), the Boeing 777 flight control system, and the Boeing 787 flight control systems, use Byzantine fault tolerance; because these are real-time systems, their Byzantine fault tolerance solutions must have very low latency. For example, SAFEbus can achieve Byzantine fault tolerance within the order of a microsecond of added latency.

=== In space systems ===
The SpaceX Dragon considers Byzantine fault tolerance in its design. The Ares rocket avionics, now the Space Launch System (SLS), utilizes a triplex with an interstage of accomplish Byzantine resilience. The Orion spacecraft utilizes self-checking pairs to detect and mask Byzantine faults.

=== In democracy and civil societies ===
In legislatures, civil societies, polls, statistical surveys, and so forth, systems that require a minimum supermajority threshold agreement greater than two-thirds are similar to consensus reflective of Byzantine Fault Tolerant -like characteristics. By contrast, systems that operate on the sub-supermajority basis of simple majorities or a minority government could be vulnerable to Byzantine fault -like behavior.

== See also ==
- Atomic commit – Operation that applies a set of distinct changes as a single operation
- Brooks–Iyengar algorithm – Distributed algorithm for sensor networks
- Conflict-free replicated data type – Type of data structure
- List of terms relating to algorithms and data structures
- Paxos (computer science) – Family of protocols for solving consensus
- Quantum Byzantine agreement – Quantum version of the Byzantine agreement protocol
- Two Generals' Problem – Thought experiment
- Two-thirds supermajority rule – Voting requirement above 2/3 for passage

== Sources ==
- Deirmentzoglou, Evangelos; Papakyriakopoulos, Georgios; Patsakis, Constantinos (2019). "A Survey on Long-Range Attacks for Proof of Stake Protocols". IEEE Access. 7: 28712–28725. Bibcode:2019IEEEA...728712D. doi:10.1109/ACCESS.2019.2901858. eISSN 2169-3536. S2CID 84185792.
- Bashir, Imran. "Blockchain Consensus." Blockchain Consensus - An Introduction to Classical, Blockchain, and Quantum Consensus Protocols. ISBN 978-1-4842-8178-9 Apress, Berkeley, CA, 2022. doi:10.1007/978-1-4842-8179-6
