= Sybil attack =

Network service attack performed by multiple fake identities

A Sybil attack is a type of attack on a computer network service in which an attacker subverts the service's reputation system by creating a large number of pseudonymous identities and uses them to gain a disproportionately large influence. It is named after the subject of the book Sybil, a case study of a woman diagnosed with dissociative identity disorder. The name was suggested in or before 2002 by Brian Zill at Microsoft Research. The term pseudospoofing had previously been coined by L. Detweiler on the Cypherpunks mailing list and used in the literature on peer-to-peer systems for the same class of attacks prior to 2002, but this term did not gain as much influence as "Sybil attack".

== Description ==
The Sybil attack in computer security is an attack wherein a reputation system is subverted by creating multiple identities. A reputation system's vulnerability to a Sybil attack depends on how cheaply identities can be generated, the degree to which the reputation system accepts inputs from entities that do not have a chain of trust linking them to a trusted entity, and whether the reputation system treats all entities identically. As of 2012, evidence showed that large-scale Sybil attacks could be carried out in a very cheap and efficient way in extant realistic systems such as BitTorrent Mainline DHT.

An entity on a peer-to-peer network is a piece of software that has access to local resources. An entity advertises itself on the peer-to-peer network by presenting an identity. More than one identity can correspond to a single entity. In other words, the mapping of identities to entities is many to one. Entities in peer-to-peer networks use multiple identities for purposes of redundancy, resource sharing, reliability and integrity. In peer-to-peer networks, the identity is used as an abstraction so that a remote entity can be aware of identities without necessarily knowing the correspondence of identities to local entities. By default, each distinct identity is usually assumed to correspond to a distinct local entity. In reality, many identities may correspond to the same local entity.

An adversary may present multiple identities to a peer-to-peer network in order to appear and function as multiple distinct nodes. The adversary may thus be able to acquire a disproportionate level of control over the network, such as by affecting voting outcomes.

In the context of (human) online communities, such multiple identities are sometimes known as sockpuppets. The less common term inverse-Sybil attack has been used to describe an attack in which many entities appear as a single identity.

Sybil style attacks on online communities can often be mistaken as being performed by automated programs (bots).

== Example ==
A notable Sybil attack in conjunction with a traffic confirmation attack was launched against the Tor anonymity network for several months in 2014.

There are other examples of Sybil attacks run against Tor network users. This includes the 2020 Bitcoin address rewrite attacks. The attacker controlled a quarter of all Tor exit relays and employed SSL stripping to downgrade secure connections and divert funds to the wallet of the threat actor known as BTCMITM20.

Another notable example is the 2017–2021 attack run by threat actor KAX17. This entity controlled over 900 malicious servers, primarily middle points, in an attempt to deanonymize Tor users.

== Prevention ==
Known approaches to Sybil attack prevention include identity validation, social trust graph algorithms, economic costs, personhood validation, and application-specific defenses.

=== Identity validation ===
Validation techniques can be used to prevent Sybil attacks and dismiss masquerading hostile entities. A local entity may accept a remote identity based on a central authority which ensures a one-to-one correspondence between an identity and an entity and may even provide a reverse lookup. An identity may be validated either directly or indirectly. In direct validation the local entity queries the central authority to validate the remote identities. In indirect validation the local entity relies on already-accepted identities which in turn vouch for the validity of the remote identity in question.

Practical network applications and services often use a variety of identity proxies to achieve limited Sybil attack resistance, such as telephone number verification, credit card verification, or even based on the IP address of a client. These methods have the limitations that it is usually possible to obtain multiple such identity proxies at some cost – or even to obtain many at low cost through techniques such as SMS spoofing or IP address spoofing. Use of such identity proxies can also exclude those without ready access to the required identity proxy: e.g., those without their own mobile phone or credit card, or users located behind carrier-grade network address translation who share their IP addresses with many others.

Identity-based validation techniques generally provide accountability at the expense of anonymity, which can be an undesirable tradeoff especially in online forums that wish to permit censorship-free information exchange and open discussion of sensitive topics. A validation authority can attempt to preserve users' anonymity by refusing to perform reverse lookups, but this approach makes the validation authority a prime target for attack. Protocols using threshold cryptography can potentially distribute the role of such a validation authority among multiple servers, protecting users' anonymity even if one or a limited number of validation servers is compromised.

=== Social trust graphs ===
Sybil prevention techniques based on the connectivity characteristics of social graphs can also limit the extent of damage that can be caused by a given Sybil attacker while preserving anonymity. Examples of such prevention techniques include SybilGuard, SybilLimit, the Advogato Trust Metric, SybilRank, and the sparsity based metric to identify Sybil clusters in a distributed P2P based reputation system.

These techniques cannot prevent Sybil attacks entirely, and may be vulnerable to widespread small-scale Sybil attacks. In addition, it is not clear whether real-world online social networks will satisfy the trust or connectivity assumptions that these algorithms assume.

=== Economic costs ===
Alternatively, imposing economic costs as artificial barriers to entry may be used to make Sybil attacks more expensive. Proof of work, for example, requires a user to prove that they expended a certain amount of computational effort to solve a cryptographic puzzle. In Bitcoin and related permissionless cryptocurrencies, miners compete to append blocks to a blockchain and earn rewards roughly in proportion to the amount of computational effort they invest in a given time period. Investments in other resources such as storage or stake in existing cryptocurrency may similarly be used to impose economic costs.

=== Elimination Voting ===
Atomic Ownership Blockchains thwart Sybil attacks through its decentralized architecture of independent micro-private chains per atomic asset. Each chain is controlled solely by its cryptographic owner via signatures, bypassing node-voting consensus. Attackers cannot amplify influence by spawning fake identities, as security relies on broadcast timing and verifiable transfers, not participant count or resource pooling, ensuring equitable, tamper-proof circulation.

=== Personhood validation ===
As an alternative to identity verification that attempts to maintain a strict "one-per-person" allocation rule, a validation authority can use some mechanism other than knowledge of a user's real identity – such as verification of an unidentified person's physical presence at a particular place and time as in a pseudonym party – to enforce a one-to-one correspondence between online identities and real-world users. Such proof of personhood approaches have been proposed as a basis for permissionless blockchains and cryptocurrencies in which each human participant would wield exactly one vote in consensus. A variety of approaches to proof of personhood have been proposed, some with deployed implementations, although many usability and security issues remain. Deployed examples include World ID, developed by Tools for Humanity, which uses a device called the Orb to take images of users' irises, these images are then converted into a unique cryptographic identifier, and Human Passport (formerly Gitcoin Passport), which lets users collect verifiable credentials to show they are a unique human.

=== Application-specific defenses ===
A number of distributed protocols have been designed with Sybil attack protection in mind. SumUp and DSybil are Sybil-resistant algorithms for online content recommendation and voting. Whānau is a Sybil-resistant distributed hash table algorithm. I2P's implementation of Kademlia also has provisions to mitigate Sybil attacks.

== See also ==
- Astroturfing
- Ballot stuffing
- Social bot
- Sockpuppetry
