= Uniform consensus =

Distributed computing problem

In computer science, Uniform consensus is a distributed computing problem that is a similar to the consensus problem with one more condition which is no two processes (whether faulty or not) decide differently.

More specifically one should consider this problem:

- Each process has an input, should decide on an output (one-shot problem)
- Uniform Agreement: every two decisions are the same
- Validity: every decision is an input of one of the processes
- Termination: eventually all correct processes decide
