= MazaCoin =

Cryptocurrency adopted by Lakota Nation

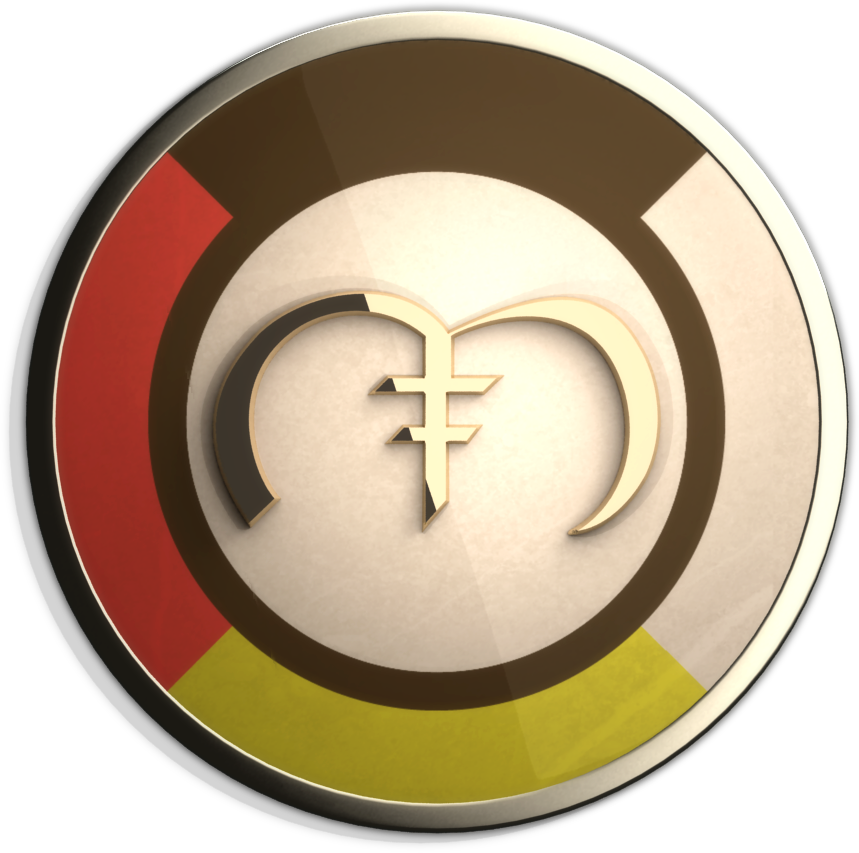
- MazaCoin logo

Denominations
- Code: MZC
- Precision: 10^{−8}

Development
- Original author(s): Payu Harris, AnonymousPirate
- White paper: mazacoin.org/docs/MAZA-whitepaper-2014.pdf
- Initial release: 7 February 2014; 12 years ago
- Code repository: github.com/MazaCoin/maza
- Project fork of: Zetacoin, Bitcoin
- Written in: C++
- Operating system: Windows, OS X, Linux
- Source model: Open source
- License: MIT License

Ledger
- Timestamping scheme: Proof-of-work
- Block reward: 250 MAZA (as of September 3, 2021), (halved every 950,000 blocks)
- Block time: 1 minute
- Block explorer: mazacha.in

Website
- Website: Official website

MazaCoin (Maza, MZC) is a cryptocurrency launched in 2014 by developer Payu Harris. It was created with the goal of providing a digital currency for the Oglala Lakota tribe in South Dakota.

== History ==
MazaCoin was developed by Payu Harris in 2014. MazaCoin was specifically designed for the Oglala Lakota tribe in South Dakota. Some Native Americans adopted the use of MazaCoin to assert sovereignty against the US Government and independence against the American regulatory system. The currency began being used by the Lakota Nation in 2014, with half of its supply reserved by the tribe to minimize the price volatility common in cryptocurrencies.

In October 2017, a Mashable article on the Oglala Lakota included a video about Harris's efforts to increase acceptance of MazaCoin. In 2017, The Lakota leadership formally recognized MazaCoin as their national currency, but this decision encountered skepticism within the community. The concept of digital currencies, heavily reliant on technology such as apps and smartphones, was less accessible to older generations and those without consistent internet access. To counteract this, a system of paper wallets was developed, allowing MazaCoin to be stored and used in a more traditional, physical format. This system allowed tribal members to use MazaCoin in physical form for transactions within the community, converting it back to digital format at the centralized facility.

By 2022, Harris had begun to pitch the coin across the tribe and help educate members on setting up wallets. He noted that interest in the coin had increased as cryptocurrency began to enter the mainstream.
