= Emin Gün Sirer =

Turkish-American computer scientist

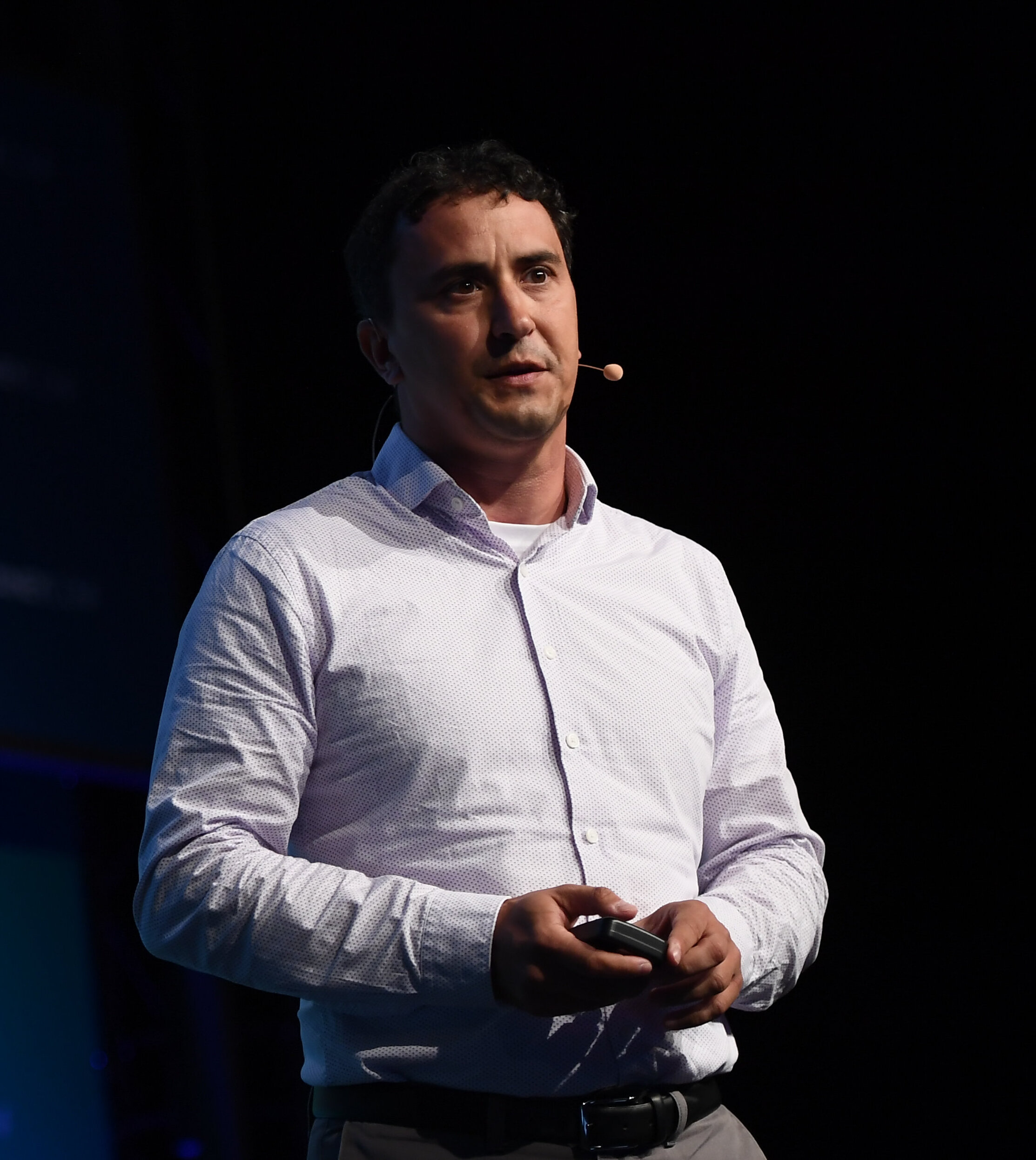
- Citizenship: United States
- Education: Princeton University; University of Washington
- Known for: SPIN, HyperDex, and Ava Labs
- Awards: National Science Foundation CAREER Award
- Scientific career
- Fields: Computer Science
- Workplaces: Cornell University
- Thesis: Secure, Efficient and Manageable Virtual Machine Systems. (2002)
- Doctoral advisor: Brian N. Bershad
- Website: www.cs.cornell.edu/people/egs/

Emin Gün Sirer is a Turkish-American computer scientist. Sirer developed the Avalanche Consensus protocol underlying the Avalanche blockchain platform, and is the CEO and co-founder of Ava Labs. He was an associate professor of computer science at Cornell University and is the former co-director of The Initiative for Cryptocurrencies and Smart Contracts (IC3). He is known for his contributions to peer-to-peer systems, operating systems, and computer networking.

== Education ==
Emin Gün Sirer attended high school at Robert College, received his undergraduate degree in computer science at Princeton University, and completed his graduate studies at the University of Washington. He received his Ph.D. in Computer Science and Engineering in 2002 under the supervision of Brian N. Bershad.

== Career ==
Prior to his appointment as a professor at Cornell University, Sirer worked at AT&T Bell Labs on Plan 9, at DEC SRC, and at NEC.

Sirer is known for his contributions to operating systems, distributed systems, and fundamental cryptocurrency research. He co-developed the operating system SPIN, where the implementation and interface of an operating system could be modified at run-time by type-safe extension code. He also led the Nexus OS effort, where he developed new techniques for attesting to and reasoning about the semantic properties of remote programs.

=== Early cryptocurrency research – KARMA (2003) ===
Sirer currently has over 21,000 citations on Google Scholar. His work includes operating systems (SPIN, Nexus OS), peer-to-peer systems (KARMA, Credence), blockchain scalability (Bitcoin-NG), and cryptocurrency security (selfish mining attack).

In 2003, Sirer and co-authors Vivek Vishnumurthy and Sangeeth Chandrakumar introduced KARMA, a peer-to-peer virtual currency system that predated Bitcoin by five years. It is the first peer-to-peer currency with a distributed mint using proof-of-work consensus, introducing key concepts around decentralized trust management and incentive mechanisms for peer-to-peer resource sharing. The system was designed to address the "free-rider problem" in peer-to-peer networks by creating a decentralized economic framework in which participants could not counterfeit currency and supply was regulated through anti-inflation mechanisms.

Sirer has filed multiple patent applications through Cornell University related to distributed systems and blockchain technology, including systems for managing dependencies between operations in distributed environments (related to the HyperDex distributed key-value store), methods for implementing virtual machines across distributed service components, and systems for enabling off-chain blockchain transactions via trusted execution environments.

In February 2005, Sirer was issued a patent for "A Process for Rewriting Executable Content on a Network Server or Desktop Machine in Order to Enforce Site-Specific Properties."

While at Cornell University, Sirer co-authored HyperDex (2012), a distributed searchable key-value store that uses hyperspace hashing.

Sirer and Ittay Eyal wrote and published the paper "Majority is not Enough, Bitcoin Mining is Vulnerable," which describes the selfish mining attack. This attack on Bitcoin can be profitable for an attacker controlling as little as 33% of the total hash power, which is less than the 50% required by the original security analysis in Satoshi Nakamoto's Bitcoin whitepaper. Sirer, Eyal, and other co-authors developed Bitcoin-NG, a Bitcoin scaling solution, and Bitcoin Covenants, a security solution.

In June 2016, days before the high-profile exploit of The DAO smart contract on the Ethereum blockchain, Sirer and collaborators, including Vlad Zamfir, published a paper titled "A Call for a Temporary Moratorium on The DAO," identifying multiple security vulnerabilities.

Sirer co-founded bloXroute Labs, a blockchain infrastructure company focused on addressing scalability challenges at the network layer (Layer-0) of blockchain protocols. The company provides a blockchain distribution network that enables blockchains to scale by addressing network-level bottlenecks.

Sirer participated as a consultant in the United Kingdom's Open Central Bank Digital Currency Project. In 2020, he was the co-director of IC3, the Initiative for Cryptocurrency and Contracts. He also actively engaged with the Chinese-speaking community through the 8BTC Forum in November 2019.

=== Avalanche protocol ===
Sirer led the development of the Avalanche blockchain platform, and its native token, AVAX. Within its first two years, Ava Labs raised more than $60 million in venture capital and other funding. Sirer said that he chose to bring Avalanche to market rather than first subjecting the protocol to an extended academic peer-review process. He first developed Avalanche at Cornell with assistance from PhD candidates Maofan Yin and Kevin Sekniqi.

In August 2022, "Crypto Leaks" alleged that Ava Labs and Sirer had an undisclosed arrangement with the lawyr Kyle Roche involving litigation against Avalanche's competitors. Sirer denied the allegations, and Roche subsequently left his law firm, Roche Freedman.

=== Congressional testimony (2023) ===
In June 2023, Sirer was an expert witness before the United States House Committee on Financial Services during hearings on the future of digital assets, providing technical and scientific perspectives on blockchain technology and its regulatory implications.

=== CFTC Technical Advisory Committee (2023-present) ===
In March 2023, Sirer was appointed to the Commodity Futures Trading Commission’s Technical Advisory Committee, where he serves alongside other technology and financial professionals to advise the Commission on issues such as technology, law, policy, and finance, particularly regarding blockchain technology and digital assets.

== Awards ==
- Brilliant-10 by Popular Science
- National Science Foundation CAREER Award

== See also ==
- List of people in blockchain technology
