= Proof of authority =

Blockchain algorithm

Proof of authority (PoA) is a category of consensus protocols used with blockchains based on reputation and identity as a stake that delivers comparatively fast and efficient transactions (compared to proof-of-work and proof-of-stake). The most notable platforms using PoA are VeChain, Bitgert, Palm Network and Xodex.

== Description ==
Proof-of-authority is a category of consensus protocols for networks and blockchains where transactions and blocks are built and validated by approved entities known as validators. Their permissions are often granted through a centralized authority, but they can also be granted through a council or decentralized organization. The term "proof-of-authority" was coined by Gavin Wood, co-founder of Ethereum and Parity Technologies.

With PoA, validators are incentivized to maintain good behavior and honesty when validating blocks to avoid developing a negative reputation. PoA can have higher security than PoW and even PoS due to validators wanting to avoid damaging their reputation. Because PoA is permissioned, it is not fully trustless. Validators without good reputation may risk having their validator permissions removed. PoA is generally more efficient than PoW and PoS because it operates with fewer nodes and validators, thus requiring fewer duplicated resources.

== See also ==
- Proof of personhood
- Proof of space
