= List of bitcoin companies =

List of companies with activities related to Bitcoin

This is a list of for-profit companies with notable commercial activities related to bitcoin. Common services are cryptocurrency wallet providers, bitcoin exchanges, payment service providers (Note: also known as bitcoin payment processors) and venture capital. Other services include mining pools, cloud mining, peer-to-peer lending, exchange-traded funds, over-the-counter trading, gambling, micropayments, affiliates and prediction markets.

Company	Founded	Headquarters		Service	Notes	Refs
Company	Founded	Country	City	Service	Notes	Refs
Binance	2017	Japan	Unknown	bitcoin exchange, wallet provider		
Bitcoin.com	2010	Japan	Tokyo	bitcoin exchange, wallet provider		
Bitfinex	2012	Hong Kong		bitcoin exchange, digital currency exchange, electronic trading platform		
BitGo	2013	United States	San Francisco	multisignature security platform for bitcoin		
BitMain	2013	China	Beijing	ASIC based bitcoin miners		
BitMEX	2014	Seychelles		cryptocurrency derivatives trading platform		
BitPay	2011	United States	Atlanta	payment service provider		
Bitstamp	2011	Luxembourg		bitcoin exchange		
Bitvavo	2018	Netherlands	Amsterdam	bitcoin exchange, digital currency exchange		
Bitwala	2015	Germany	Berlin	bitcoin debit card, international transfers, bitcoin wallet		
Blockchain.com	2011	Luxembourg		wallet provider		
Blockstream	2014	United States	San Francisco	software		
BTC-e	2011	Russia		bitcoin exchange	Shut down by the United States government in July 2017	
Bundle Africa	2019	Nigeria	Nigeria	Cryptocurrency exchange, cryptocurrencies		
Canaan Creative	2013	China	Beijing	ASIC based bitcoin miners		
Chainalysis	2014	United States	New York City	Blockchain analysis		
Circle	2013	United States	Boston	wallet provider		
Coinbase	2012	United States	No headquarters (Note: Coinbase's legal address is at the Corporation Trust Center in Wilmington, Delaware)	wallet provider, bitcoin exchange		
Coincheck	2014	Japan	Tokyo	bitcoin/ether exchange, wallet provider, payment service provider, donation-based bitcoin crowdfunding		
CoinDesk (part of Digital Currency Group)	2013	United States	New York City	news		
CoinShares International	1999	United Kingdom	Saint Helier, Jersey	provider of exchange-traded crypto products	Founded as Global Advisors (Jersey) Limited	
Crypto.com	2013	Singapore	Singapore	cryptocurrency exchange		
Cryptopia	2014	New Zealand	Christchurch	cryptocurrency exchange	Liquidated in 2019, ongoing investigation	
Digital Asset Holdings	2014	United States	New York City	blockchain financial services		
Gemini	2015	United States	New York City	bitcoin and ethereum exchange		
Genesis (part of Digital Currency Group)	2013	United States	Stamford, Connecticut (previously New York City)	cryptocurrency trading, lending, and asset custody platform, targeted towards institutional clients and high net worth individuals	Declared bankruptcy in 2023.	
FTX	2019	Bahamas	Nassau	cryptocurrency exchange	Incorporated in Antigua and Barbuda. Declared bankruptcy in 2022.	
Ghash.io (CEX.IO)	2013	United Kingdom	London	mining pool (CEX.IO was an exchange)	Closed in October 2016	
HTX (formerly Huobi)	2013	Seychelles		bitcoin exchange		
Kraken	2011	United States	San Francisco	bitcoin exchange		
LocalBitcoins	2012	Finland	Helsinki	over-the-counter trading		
OKEx	2014	China	Beijing	bitcoin exchange		
Paxos	2012	United States	New York City	cryptocurrency exchange, brokerage, stablecoin		
ShapeShift	2013	Switzerland		digital currency exchange		
Upbit	2017	South Korea		cryptocurrency exchange		
Xapo	2014	Switzerland	Zürich	wallet provider, bitcoin exchange, vault, debit card		

Former/defunct companies
