= Benjamin Lawsky =

American lawyer

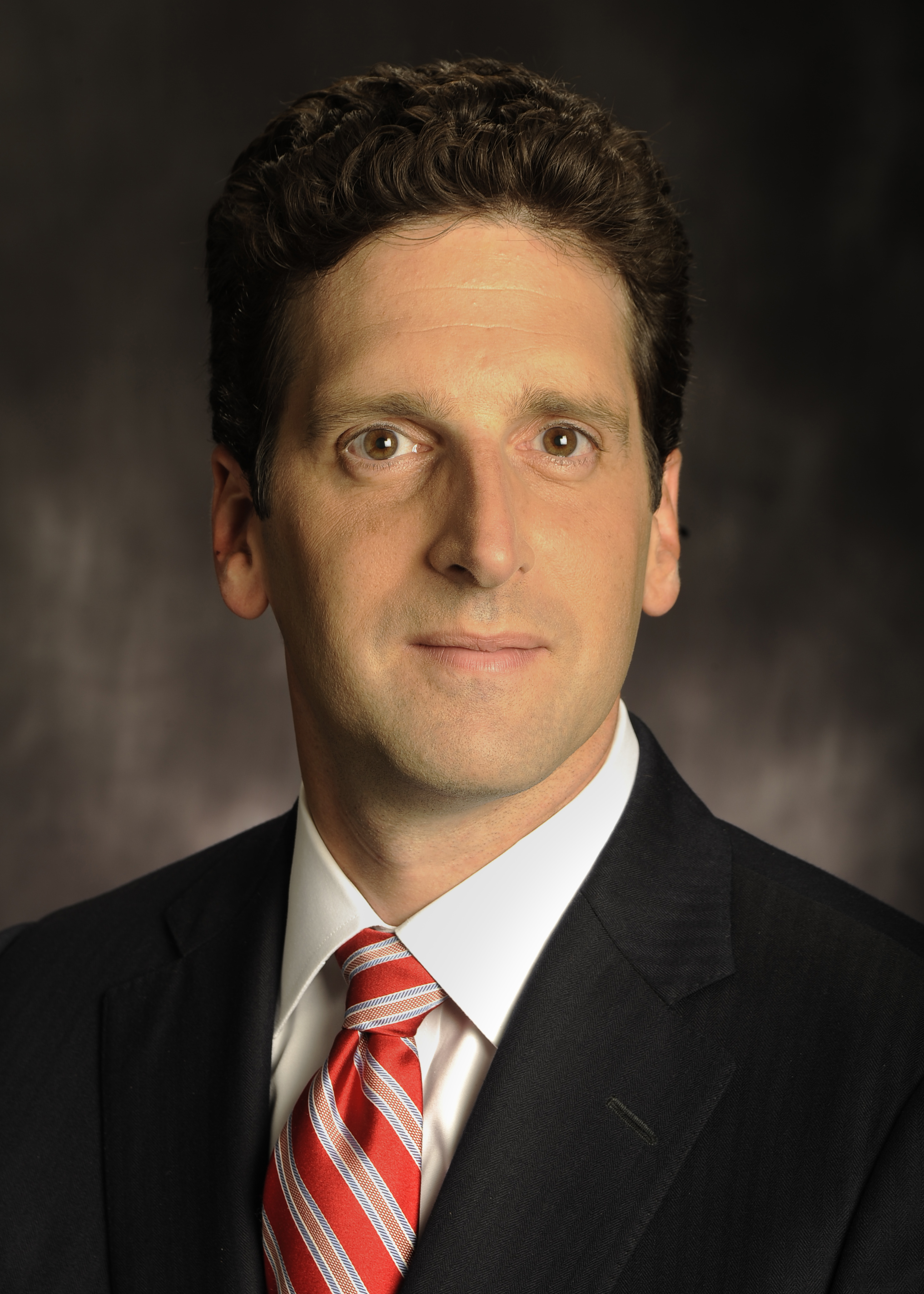

New York Superintendent of Financial Services
- In office May 24, 2011 – June 2015
- Governor: Andrew Cuomo
- Preceded by: Position established
- Succeeded by: Anthony Albanese (Acting)

Personal details
- Born: April 14, 1970 (age 56) San Diego, California, U.S.
- Party: Democratic
- Spouse: Jessica Roth
- Education: Columbia Law School (BA, JD)

Benjamin Meier Lawsky (born April 14, 1970) is an American attorney and New York State's first Superintendent of Financial Services serving through June, 2015, and former Acting Superintendent of Banks serving through 2011.

== Early life and education ==
Lawsky was born near a Navy base in San Diego, California, but grew up in Pittsburgh, Pennsylvania with a twin sister. His mother was a computer systems analyst for the Mellon Bank and his father a radiologist.

Lawsky is a graduate of Columbia Law School and Columbia College. He married attorney Jessica Roth in 2002.

== Career ==
Up until 2001 Lawsky was the chief counsel, in Washington, to Senator Charles E. Schumer. Subsequently, Lawsky had a senior role in the New York Attorney General's Office and also served as Governor Andrew Cuomo's Chief of Staff.

Having started his career with two federal judicial clerkships in the Eastern District of New York and the 2nd Circuit, he has also been an assistant U.S. Attorney in the Southern District of New York.

=== Superintendent of Financial Services ===
On May 24, 2011, The New York State Legislature unanimously confirmed Lawsky as New York State's first Superintendent of Financial Services.

From May 24, 2011 until October 3, 2011, Lawsky was appointed, and served as, Acting Superintendent of Banks for the former New York State Banking Department, in which position he led Governor Andrew M. Cuomo's initiative to consolidate the New York State Banking Department and New York State Insurance Department towards a new financial regulator called the Department of Financial Services (DFS).

He investigated Standard Chartered Bank and accused the bank of conducting secret money laundering transactions with Iran, triggering a 23.5% drop in share price.

On August 14, 2012, Standard Chartered Bank agreed to pay a fine of $340 million (£220 million) to the New York State Department of Financial Services, conceding that $14 million in financial transactions involving Iranian parties were in violation of U.S. banking laws.

On June 18, 2013, the Department announced that Deloitte Financial Advisory Services LLP (“Deloitte FAS”) was fined $10 million and banned from advising banks in New York for one year after accusing the firm of watering down a report about money-laundering controls at Standard Chartered.

On September 11, 2013, Lawsky's office announced that New York State would opt out of an agreement on new capital reserve standards for the life insurance industry.

In a letter to other states' insurance regulators, Lawsky said that recent tests of insurance industry accounting practices had revealed "gamesmanship and abuses" regarding assessment of insurers' liquid reserves and leveraging practices.

He is noted for targeting individuals within the financial sector who commit wrongdoing, and not merely handing out fines to the companies they work for, an approach he explains as follows: "Corporations are a legal fiction. You have to deter bad individual conduct within corporations. People who did the conduct are going to be held accountable."

As Superintendent of Financial Services, he was paid an annual salary of $127,000.

While serving as Superintendent, and following public hearings on the topic, Lawsky is credited with introducing some of the first regulations in the United States specifically affecting bitcoin depository institutions and cryptocurrency exchanges.

Lawsky announced in May 2015 that he would be stepping down the following month to launch his own legal and consulting firm, later named the Lawsky Group.

The New York Times reviewed his "polarizing" tenure positively, saying that the state's banks would not miss the Columbia graduate, he having "threatened to pull their licenses, fined them hundreds of millions of dollars and forced dozens of their employees to resign."

Lawsky garnered multiple awards and distinctions during his four years as bank regulator, including as one of Foreign Policy's 'Top 100 Global Thinkers' and Bloomberg Markets' '50 Most Influential in Global Finance'.

On September 17, 2024, Lawsky joined the Regulatory Advisory Board of Norm Ai.
