= Genesis (cryptocurrency company) =

Cryptocurrency brokerage

- Type: Subsidiary (in liquidation)
- Industry: Financial services
- Founded: 2013
- Founder: Barry Silbert
- Fate: Entered Chapter 11 bankruptcy (2023); currently in post-confirmation wind-down (since August 2, 2024)
- Area served: Worldwide
- Key people: Mark Renzi (Plan Administrator); Derar Islim (former interim CEO)
- Parent: Digital Currency Group (formerly)
- Website: genesistrading.com

Genesis is a cryptocurrency intermediary for institutional investors, with Digital Currency Group (DCG) as its parent company.

Genesis operates several businesses, including Genesis Global Trading, Inc. ("GGT"), Genesis Global Capital, LLC ("GGC"), Genesis Asia Pacific Pte. Ltd. ("GAP"), GGC International Limited ("GGCI"), and Genesis Custody Limited ("Genesis Custody"). Genesis Trading provides over-the-counter (OTC) trading services for large-volume digital assets transactions. Genesis' lending business offers institutional lending services to clients who want to borrow or lend digital assets.

Genesis filed for Chapter 11 bankruptcy on January 19, 2023, to request court protection to reorganize its digital assets lending and borrowing business.

== History ==
Founded in 2013, Genesis Global Trading, Inc. operates as a subsidiary of the Digital Currency Group, a venture capital company founded by Barry Silbert.

Genesis' business consists of entities that provide trading, lending, and custody digital assets, targeting institutional clients and high-net-worth individuals. They claim to have been the first OTC Bitcoin trading desk, launched in 2013.

Genesis acquired the London-based crypto asset custodian company Volt in early 2020. Grayscale Investments' crypto assets were held by Xapo, which Coinbase bought in 2019. After the Volt acquisition, Genesis moved its crypto custody from Coinbase to Grayscale.

In early July 2022, Genesis' parent company Digital Currency Group (DCG) took on some of Genesis' debts to keep the company afloat after it was left exposed to losses from loans made to Singapore-based crypto lender Babel Finance and the bankrupt crypto hedge fund, Three Arrows Capital (3AC).

Former CEO Michael Moro stepped down from his post on August 17, 2022. Genesis COO Derar Islim assumed the role of Interim CEO.

In November 2022, the company said that it had $2.8 billion in outstanding loans. The company hired investment bank Moelis & Company to assist in restructuring. The options the company was considering at the time included declaring bankruptcy. In the same month, Barron's reported that Genesis was under investigation by state securities regulators.

On January 12, 2023, the Securities and Exchange Commission charged Genesis Global Capital, LLC with the unregistered offer and sale of securities to retail investors through Gemini Trust Company’s Gemini Earn crypto asset lending program. The SEC is seeking permanent injunctive relief, disgorgement of ill-gotten gains plus prejudgment interest, and civil penalties against both Gemini and Genesis.

On January 19, 2023, Genesis Global Holdco, LLC and two of its lending business subsidiaries, Genesis Global Capital, LLC and Genesis Asia Pacific Pte. Ltd., filed voluntarily petitions under Chapter 11 of the U.S. Bankruptcy Code in the Southern District of New York. Genesis listed over 100,000 creditors with aggregate liabilities in the range of US$1.2–11 billion dollars.

The company stated that its derivatives and spot trading business were not a part of the bankruptcy filing and continue operating.

On February 6, 2023, Genesis Global Holdco announced an agreement in principle with DCG and creditors of Genesis Global Capital. The agreement was filed with the court on February 10, 2023 describes that DCG will give its equity interest in Genesis Global Trading, Inc. (GGT) to Genesis Global Holdco, LLC.. DCG will also refinance its loans from Genesis and exchange its existing $1.1 billion promissory note for convertible preferred stock issued by DCG.

After Genesis paused the withdrawals for Gemini customers claiming there was a liquidity mismatch, some of the customers formed what is now known as the Ad Hoc Group (AHG), who support the filing and confirmation of a "No Deal" Plan, seeking to deny approval of the Disclosure Statement and Motion. The AHG said that the Plan does not provide adequate information, that it does not identify the Released Parties and permits the Special Committee to designate any current and former officers and directors of the Debtors as Released Parties at any time and for any reason. Also the Plan does not provide information regarding any impact on Recoveries that legislation against Gemini including NYAG Action could cause.

=== Post-bankruptcy wind-down ===
On August 2, 2024, Genesis Global Holdco and its affiliated debtors officially completed their Chapter 11 restructuring and entered a post-confirmation wind-down phase. Upon the bankruptcy plan's effective date, the company began distributing approximately $4 billion in digital assets and U.S. dollars to its creditors. The court-approved plan did not cap creditor recoveries at their fiat value from the petition date. Instead, distributions were made on an in-kind basis to return the specific cryptocurrencies owed. During the initial distribution phase, U.S. dollar and stablecoin creditors received 100% of their funds, while cryptocurrency creditors recovered an average of 64% of their digital assets, with returns varying by coin type (e.g., 51.28% for Bitcoin and 65.87% for Ethereum).

As part of the Chapter 11 plan, Mark Renzi of the Berkeley Research Group (BRG) was appointed as the plan administrator to oversee the wind-down operations, final claims reconciliation, and the distribution of remaining assets. The restructuring effectively severed Genesis's operational ties with its former parent company, Digital Currency Group (DCG). A new board of directors was appointed for Genesis Global Holdco, operating alongside a Wind-Down Oversight Committee and a Litigation Oversight Committee. The plan also established a $70 million litigation fund-funded through a combination of Bitcoin, Ethereum, and U.S. dollars-specifically designed to pursue legal actions against third parties, including claims against DCG.
