= Barry Silbert =

American entrepreneur and investor (born 1976)

- Born: 1976 (age 49–50); Gaithersburg, Maryland, United States
- Education: Emory University (BBA)
- Occupations: Entrepreneur investor
- Known for: Early investor in Bitcoin

Barry Silbert is an American entrepreneur and investor who is the CEO of the Digital Currency Group. As of 2022, he was estimated to have a net worth of $3.2 billion.

== Career ==
In 2004, Silbert founded SecondMarket, an online marketplace for shares in private technology companies. It was valued at $200 million in 2011. It was acquired by Nasdaq in 2015.

Silbert began buying up Bitcoin in 2012. In 2015, Silbert sold SecondMarket to Nasdaq in 2015.

In October 2015, Silbert founded Digital Currency Group (DCG). From the outset, DCG operated two wholly-owned subsidiaries, Genesis Global Trading and Grayscale Investments. Genesis filed for bankruptcy in 2023 after one of its largest lenders, Three Arrows Capital, defaulted on its loans totaling $1.2 billion.

In November 2024, Silbert announced that he was launching Yuma, a decentralized artificial intelligence company.

In August 2025, Silbert returned as chairman of Grayscale Investments, a subsidiary of the Digital Currency Group, following leadership changes at the company.
