= Ladle =

Ladle may refer to:

- Ladle (spoon), a bowl-shaped serving device for liquids such as soup
- Ladle (metallurgy), a vessel used to carry, and pour molten metal
- Ladle, a monthly tournament of Armagetron Advanced
