= GBTC =

GBTC may refer to:

- Grayscale Bitcoin Trust
- Greater Boston Track Club
