= Gemini (cryptocurrency exchange) =

Digital currency exchange and custodian

- Type: Public
- Traded as: Nasdaq: GEMI
- Industry: Cryptocurrency; Financial services
- Founded: May 2014; 12 years ago
- Founder: Cameron Winklevoss; Tyler Winklevoss
- Headquarters: 600 Third Avenue, 2nd Floor, New York City, United States
- Area served: Worldwide
- Key people: Cameron Winklevoss (CEO); Tyler Winklevoss (President); Dan Chen (CFO)
- Products: Gemini cryptocurrency exchange; Gemini Dollar (GUSD); Crypto custody and staking; Cryptocurrency credit card
- Revenue: ▲US$142.2 million (2024)
- Net income: ▼US$165.8 million (2024)
- Total assets: US$1.59 billion (2024)
- Website: gemini.com

Gemini Space Station Inc. (Gemini) is an American cryptocurrency exchange and custodian bank. It was founded in 2014 by Cameron and Tyler Winklevoss.

== History ==
=== 2013–2017: Early history ===
Tyler and Cameron Winklevoss announced Gemini in June 2013 and the company went live on October 25, 2015. Gemini began facilitating the purchase and storage of Bitcoin through a system of private keys and password-protected environments. Gemini holds a Limited Purpose Trust Charter from the New York Department of Financial Services, granted in October 2015. Gemini subsequently expanded the financial services it offers, including FIX and API support.

On May 5, 2016, Governor Andrew Cuomo of New York State announced the approval of Gemini as the first licensed U.S.-based Ethereum exchange. Additionally, in 2016, Gemini announced that it would allow users to withdraw Ethereum Classic (ETC) from the exchange following a hard fork in Ethereum's code.

=== Development ===
In October 2017, Gemini announced that it allowed registered users to withdraw Bitcoin Cash from the exchange provided they had a balance available on the exchange before the Bitcoin hard fork in August 2017.

In December 2017, the Chicago Board Options Exchange (CBOE) began to use Gemini to settle its Bitcoin futures contracts. CBOE partnered with Gemini so as to use Gemini's dollar denominated auction price for these contracts. In March 2019, CBOE announced they would stop listing Bitcoin futures.

In April 2018, Gemini began offering "Block Trading". Block Trading enables Gemini users to buy and sell large quantities of digital assets outside of Gemini's continuous order books, creating an additional liquidity mechanism when trading in greater size. Also in April, Gemini began to utilize NASDAQ's SMARTS technology to monitor trades and combat fraudulent activity and price manipulation on its exchange. On May 14, 2018, the New York Department of Financial Services announced it had approved Gemini to offer Zcash (ZEC) on their platform, becoming the first licensed exchange to offer trading and custody services for it. On September 10, 2018, Gemini had received regulatory approval for a new product, the Gemini dollar (GUSD) from the NYDFS and would launch trading of the coin that same day. Gemini described the product as a stablecoin which maintains a 1-to-1 peg with the American dollar. On October 3, 2018, it was announced that Gemini had obtained digital asset insurance covering tokens and coins held on its exchange. The insurance had been brokered by Aon, a London-based public risk consulting company, and underwritten by a consortium of global underwriters.

In November 2019, the Gemini Trust Co., the wholly-owned subsidiary, bought Nifty Gateway for an undisclosed sum. Nifty Gateway is a marketplace for NFTs. The goal of the NFT marketplace is to be a custodian for various assets, including property deeds, passports, commodities, collectibles, videogame characters, movies, music and event tickets.

In May 2020, a partnership was announced with Samsung whereby Samsung smartphone users could link their Samsung Blockchain Wallets to their Gemini accounts to view balances and transfer crypto.

In February 2021, Gemini announced that Gemini Earn, in partnership with cryptocurrency broker Genesis, would offer a 7.4% return on customer deposits.

In November 2021, Gemini raised a $400 million investment that values the New York parent company, Gemini Space Station, LLC, at $7.1 billion.

=== Regulatory issues and international expansion ===
On June 2, 2022, the Commodity Futures Trading Commission (CFTC) filed a suit against Gemini based on alleged misrepresentation of the company's exchange and futures contracts during 2017 meetings with the CFTC. The suit is seeking to block Gemini and its affiliates from trading commodities and getting further investments, in addition to monetary fines. Also on June 2 Cameron and Tyler Winklevoss announced they would be laying off 10% of the company staff, citing a "contraction phase" known as "crypto winter" in the cryptocurrency industry.

On January 12, 2023, the Securities and Exchange Commission charged Gemini Trust Company with the unregistered offer and sale of securities to retail investors through the Gemini Earn crypto asset lending program. As part of the same action, the SEC also charged Genesis Global Capital, a subsidiary of Digital Currency Group, which held approximately $900 million in investor assets from 340,000 Gemini Earn customers. Gemini Earn was shut down in January 2023, following Genesis suspending withdrawals in November 2022. The SEC is seeking permanent injunctive relief, disgorgement of ill-gotten gains plus prejudgment interest, and civil penalties against both Gemini and Genesis.

On February 6, 2023, Genesis Global Holdco announced an agreement in principle with Digital Currency Group and creditors of Genesis Global Capital, including Gemini. Gemini will contribute "up to $100 million in cash" to the restructuring and recovery agreement.

In May 2023, Gemini announced that Dublin, Ireland would be the location for the company's headquarters in Europe. However, in January 2025, Gemini moved its European headquarters from Dublin to Malta citing difference in present-day regulatory landscape.

In January 2024, Gemini received crypto registration in France, allowing the company to provide service in the country.

In January 2025, Gemini reached a $5 million settlement with the U.S. Commodity Futures Trading Commission (CFTC) over misleading the CFTC about a bitcoin auction. The CFTC under the Biden administration initially sued Gemini in 2022. The cases was settled by the CFTC under the second Donald Trump administration, which had eased regulatory enforcement against cryptocurrency firms. Gemini's founders, the Winklevoss twins, had donated to Donald Trump and entered into business partnerships with his sons, Eric Trump and Donald Trump Jr., prior to receiving the favorable settlement decision. The Winklesvoss twins influenced the Trump administration's staffing of the CFTC, successfully pressing Trump not to appoint Brian Quintenz.

On September 12, 2025, Gemini was listed on the Nasdaq Global Select Market following its initial public offering. The IPO was priced at $28 per share.

== 2023 New York lawsuit ==
On October 19, 2023, New York Attorney General Letitia James filed a lawsuit against Gemini and digital asset companies Digital Currency Group and Genesis Global Capital. The lawsuit focused on Gemini Earn, a program through Gemini that promised users a safe way to earn high-interest earnings; the lawsuit stated that Gemini had deceived investors about the risks of a lending service it ran in joint with Genesis. James stated that 230,000 investors lost their money due to the program. James sought over $3 billion in restitution from Gemini and Genesis.

In February 2024, Genesis settled after filing bankruptcy. Part of the settlement states that Genesis would return assets to investors and pay $21 million to the SEC; the deal was made final in March 2024.

On March 1, 2024, Gemini agreed to refund at least $1.1 billion to users of its halted Earn program and pay a $37 million fine, following a settlement with the New York Department of Financial Services over allegations of unsafe practices related to its partnership with the now-bankrupt Genesis Global Capital.

== Service disruptions ==
The site's primary challenge has been remaining online at times of excessively high volumes, a relatively common occurrence for any website receiving an unusual amount of traffic. On November 28, 2017, for example, both Gemini and Coinbase crashed for several hours. Gemini was showing a "504 gateway time-out" message, and the status page showed "Systems are currently experiencing degraded performance." Subsequently, the Gemini Blog offered this comment. "This is not the first scaling challenge we've encountered, and it won't be the last. We're continuing to improve our performance and infrastructure monitoring so we can anticipate potential problems more quickly in the future."
