= GPU mining =

GPU mining of cryptocurrencies

GPU mining is the use of graphics processing units (GPUs) to "mine" proof-of-work cryptocurrencies, such as Bitcoin. Miners receive rewards for performing computationally intensive work, such as calculating hashes, that amend and verify transactions on an open and decentralized ledger. GPUs can be especially performant at calculating such hashes.

== Concerns about GPU mining ==
=== Environmental concerns ===
While central processing units (CPUs) were used to mine cryptocurrency in their earliest days, they were gradually replaced by higher performance GPUs. Even so, GPU mining consumes significant amounts of energy to perform their tasks. Unlike gaming PCs, GPU mining rigs usually incorporate multiple GPUs working together, and some miners may use multiple GPU mining rigs. A 2022 report by Bloomberg suggested that cryptocurrency miners spent $15 billion on GPUs during the cryptocurrency mining craze since 2021. Meanwhile, statistics suggested that 67% of the electricity powering Bitcoin mining during 2020 and 2021 was generated by fossil energy and that Bitcoin mining produced more than 85 million tons of CO_{2} during that period.

=== Security concerns ===
Due to the increased demand of GPU mining for cryptocurrency, cyber criminals have taken interest in hacking into computers to perform small mining tasks. Typically, hackers will perform cryptocurrency mining in the background by limiting the amount of GPU power by 75% allowing a small amount of GPU power to be used for cryptocurrency mining while staying undetected.

== Market impact ==
As cryptocurrency miners increased their purchases of GPUs between 2013 and 2017, the prices of GPUs skyrocketed. The increasing demand of GPU mining and purchases caused a worldwide shortage that continued into 2021 until production finally caught up in 2023. With mining firms going bankrupt, increased regulations being enforced, and the main cryptocurrencies switching to a "proof of stake" algorithm, GPU mining for cryptocurrency became highly inefficient to continue sustaining, resulting in many used GPUs for mining being sold or refurbished back onto the market, stabilizing the market to something similar to the pre-GPU mining boom.

== Profitability ==
The profitability of GPU mining depends on many factors. The first is the amount of cryptocurrency rewards that can be acquired. For instance, Bitcoin's system is pre-programmed to halve the Bitcoin rewards offered every four years or after every 210,000 blocks mined. While the original block reward was 50 bitcoins per block, it decreased to 6.25 bitcoins every block in May 2020. A second factor would be the computational power of the GPU; different GPUs have different levels of computational power that might be more advantageous for the miner to prioritize, with each new generation housing better chips equipped with increased clocked processing speeds, hashrates, and lower power usage. Similarly, the cost of electricity to power the GPU miners can affect the profitability as different regions have different energy prices.

== History ==
- The first public implementation of Bitcoin was released in early 2009. GPU mining was not possible at this stage.
- In October 2010, Graphics Processing Unit (GPU) mining devices first came about. This was made possible with the creation of software to configure GPUs for mining activities.
- June 2017, Hong-Kong based Sapphire Technology became the first firm that produced GPUs tailored specifically for GPU mining. Many of the GPUs did not have display functions and could only be used for mining.
- Around 2013 and 2017 respectively, the prices of GPUs skyrocketed amid the GPU mining craze.
- In May 2021, China officially banned all cryptocurrency mining, including GPU mining, amid concerns for the environment and economy.
- Around March 2022, the price of Bitcoin dipped from around $46,000 to $20,000 within a couple of months, creating concerns about cryptocurrency.
- In September 2022, Ethereum finished the transition from the traditional Proof of Work algorithm to a Proof of Stake algorithm, significantly reducing computational costs and thus making it economically infeasible to use GPUs to mine Ethereum. In the run-up to and following the transition, miners begun dumping their GPUs on the second-hand market. Some GPU miners switched to other Proof of Work coins such as Ethereum Classic, though these alternatives were also unprofitable.
- In early January 2023, Mining companies started refactoring their systems to house AI computation.
