= MoonPay =

Financial technology company

- Type: Private
- Industry: Cryptocurrency
- Founded: 2019; 7 years ago, in the United States
- Founders: Ivan Soto-Wright, Victor Faramond, Maximilian Crown
- Headquarters: Miami, United States
- Area served: International (160 countries in 2024)
- Services: Payment processing, blockchain infrastructure
- Total equity: $3.4 billion (2022)

MoonPay is a multinational financial technology company involved in the transfer of cryptocurrency. Founded by Ivan Soto-Wright, Victor Faramond and Maximilian Crown in 2019, the company is based in Miami and provides payment infrastructure for cryptocurrency and non-fungible tokens (NFTs) to be bought and sold with fiat currencies.

== History ==
MoonPay was launched in 2019 by business partners Victor Faramond, Maximilian Crown and Ivan Soto-Wright, the latter of whom became CEO. With headquarters in Miami, the company initially had a team of five people. MoonPay began as a crypto payment exchange, letting users purchase crypto with traditional fiat currency and then store those assets in their own wallets. The company is involved in the transfer of cryptocurrency. MoonPay also built crypto-payment infrastructures for websites.

By 2021, MoonPay had "processed $2 billion worth of crypto transactions" since its founding. It also converted "all major payment methods" into cryptocurrency, including credit cards and Apple Pay. The software was integrated into major crypto exchanges such as OpenSea and Bitcoin.com.

In its first financing round, MoonPay raised US$555 million in November 2021 in an investment led by Tiger Global Management and Coatue Management. Others investors included Blossom Capital, NEA, Thrive Capital, and Paradigm Operations. The deal valued MoonPay at $3.4 billion. After the fundraising, MoonPay outlined plans to hire 200 employees, at which point it had a staff of 130. It also said it would make acquisitions to accelerate growth.

In November 2021, MoonPay executives sold $150 million of company shares in a secondary stock sale. Wrote Fortune about the sale in 2023, "while secondary sales of equity during funding rounds were not uncommon [in 2021], investors and employees have critiqued the selloffs by executives during 2021" for occurring shortly before the 2022 crypto market crash. For 2021, MoonPay brought in $150 million in annual revenue.

According to the South Florida Business Journal, MoonPay is described as one of the largest provider of cryptocurrency payments infrastructure by early 2022. In January 2022, MoonPay began allowing customers to purchase NFTs through marketplaces with integrated MoonPay technology, as compared to only cryptocurrency. The NFT purchasing service was described by Billboard as "first-to-market technology," as previously buying NFTs through crypto marketplaces was an "arduous" process "that took customers off-platform to create a digital wallet, buy crypto, then return to spend it with several fees along the way." In January 2022, Paris Hilton and Jimmy Fallon endorsed the company's NFT purchasing technology on The Tonight Show. MoonPay also purchased NFTs directly from auction houses, and in early 2022, purchased a rare World of Women NFT for $754,340 at Christie's auction house.

By March 2022, MoonPay stated it was used in around 250 wallets, websites, and applications in around 160 countries. After the Russian invasion of Ukraine, on March 11, 2022, MoonPay ceased supporting customer accounts in Ukraine, Russia, and Belarus as a result of "political tension". In March 2022, MoonPay named James Freis as special adviser for global regulatory compliance. Freis had previously directed the Financial Crimes Enforcement Network (FinCEN) bureau in the US and blown the whistle on the Wirecard scandal. On April 12, 2022, it was reported that MoonPay had brought in around 60 entertainment and investment celebrities as backers, raising a total of $87 million. Among the named investors were The Chainsmokers. In April 2022, MoonPay announced it had been profitable since its launch and that its services were used by 10 million customers. In May 2022, MoonPay ranked No. 44 on that year's CNBC Disruptor 50 list. In summer of 2022, MoonPay announced it was partnering with MasterCard on an NFT checkout service.

MoonPay's NFT minting platform HyperMint was launched in June 2022 to provide "an alternative to centralized NFT exchanges like Opensea for creators and their supporters." For the launch, MoonPay partnered with brands such as Universal Pictures, Fox Corporation, Death Row Records, and Creative Artists Agency for the launch. Among a number of early NFT collections created through the platform, Snoop Dogg used HyperMint to "create a token-gated storefront" for merchandise related to an album release. By July 2022, the eSports organization FaZe Clan had also partnered with HyperMint.

By 2022, a number of scandals in the crypto industry as well as "macroeconomic challenges" had led to a downturn in the cryptocurrency and NFT markets, with trading volume dropping significantly. By the end of 2022, one of MoonPay's investors, Tiger Global, lowered its internal valuation of MoonPay to $2.8 billion.

In December 2022, MoonPay and Yuga Labs were sued in a class-action lawsuit alleging that Yuga Labs, Bored Apes, and MoonPay had "artificially inflated the price of [Yuga Labs'] digital offerings by using celebrity insiders, who promoted the NFTs without disclosing their financial relationships to the firm." MoonPay stated that its relevant relationships with celebrities had already been disclosed and that "we look forward to it being dismissed." Former TIME president Keith Grossman became MoonPay's President of Enterprise at the start of 2023. Prior to joining MoonPay, Grossman oversaw the magazine's TIMEPieces NFT collection.

It was reported in February 2023 that the wallet MoonPayHQ had spent at least $25 million on NFTs since 2021, with about $15 million of that spent on Bored Apes. MoonPay told CNN that they had 14 Bored Ape NFTs in a cold storage wallet which offered "more safety," and that five of the NFTs had been "purchased by concierge clients" and were in the process of being transferred. After serving as President and COO of Coinbase, Asiff Hirji was hired as MoonPay's President in February 2023. Fortune in 2023 ranked MoonPay #5 on its Crypto 40 list of cryptocurrency companies. In 2024, MoonPay had an estimated valuation of $3.4 billion and stated it had overseen the transfer of $2 billion in crypto overall. It was active in around 160 countries.

In March 2025, MoonPay expanded its enterprise footprint with two transactions: it acquired crypto checkout startup Helio for $175 million and announced the acquisition of stablecoin platform Iron to broaden its infrastructure capabilities. In April 2025, the company said it would establish a new U.S. headquarters in New York City as part of its expansion strategy. In May 2025, according to a company press release and independent coverage by CNBC, MoonPay and Mastercard announced a stablecoin-enabled debit card that converts stablecoin balances to fiat at the point of sale. In June 2025, CoinDesk reported that MoonPay received a BitLicense and a money transmitter license from the New York State Department of Financial Services.

On 19 December 2025, it was reported that Intercontinental Exchange (ICE), the parent company of New York Stock Exchange (NYSE) is in talks to invest in crypto payments company MoonPay as part of the company's latest funding round which seeks to raise funds at a $5 billion valuation.

In 2026, MoonPay began adapting its platform to support transactions initiated by artificial intelligence agents, reflecting a broader shift toward machine-driven digital commerce within the cryptocurrency industry.

== Products ==
MoonPay is a financial technology company involved in the transfer of cryptocurrency, and it has a suite of software products that convert between fiat currencies and cryptocurrencies. Users can also purchase digital assets such as NFTs on the MoonPay app, or through various web3 exchanges like Coinbase, OpenSea, MetaMask, and Bitcoin.com, which have MoonPay integrated into their platforms. MoonPay states their software accepts all major payment methods, among them among them debit and credit card, local bank transfers, Apple Pay, Google Pay, and Samsung Pay.

Beyond transfer of cryptocurrency, MoonPay operates an NFT minting platform it calls HyperMint, which can also be used to mint other digital assets besides NFTs. According to MoonPay, its software helps cryptocurrency and NFT creators and sellers stay compliant with regulators. The company also has a "concierge arm" that in 2022 became known for helping celebrities such as Jimmy Fallon purchase NFTs.

MoonPay CEO Ivan Soto-Wright has stated MoonPay does not hold customer funds as part of its business model, which is in contrast to crypto companies such as FTX, which was criticized after its 2022 bankruptcy for being unable to return digital assets to clients after storing them in custodial wallets. Soto-Wright described MoonPay’s platform as "non-custodial," arguing that MPC (multi-party computation) technology for storing assets was safer than custodial wallets and provided users with more control of their assets.

== See also ==
- List of unicorn startup companies
- IOTA
