= Luke Dashjr =

Bitcoin developer and co-founder of the Ocean mining pool

Luke Dashjr is an American software developer known for his long-standing role in the development of Bitcoin Core and for co-founding the Bitcoin mining pool Ocean.

== Career ==
=== Early involvement with Bitcoin ===
Dashjr has contributed to Bitcoin Core, an open source software implementation for Bitcoin nodes, since the early 2010s. In 2013, a bug in version 0.8 of the software caused the Bitcoin blockchain to split into two incompatible chains. For several hours, some computers accepted blocks that others rejected, creating two separate transaction histories. Developers, including Dashjr, coordinated to quickly create a consensus upgrade that restored Bitcoin to a single chain.

=== Ocean Bitcoin mining pool ===
In 2023, Dashjr co-founded Ocean, a Bitcoin mining pool with the stated goal of decentralizing Bitcoin mining by giving miners the ability to select or construct their own block templates, reducing reliance on centralized pool operators. The company received seed funding from Jack Dorsey. It was formally launched at the Future of Bitcoin Mining Conference in El Salvador.

In 2024, the pool established its global headquarters in El Salvador as part of its international expansion, citing the country's pro-Bitcoin regulatory environment. Following the decision, Dashjr stated, "El Salvador is on the leading edge of bitcoin and bitcoin mining adoption. We believe Ocean’s presence here will help to advance these efforts here and create new opportunities for El Salvador."

=== Opinions on Bitcoin ===
Dashjr believes that the number of Bitcoin nodes is higher than most estimates. In a research paper conducted by the University of Bristol, Dashjr, explained that many estimates, including those from BitNodes, underreport non-listening nodes. While BitNodes reported around 10,000 active Bitcoin nodes, Dashjr believes that over 100,000 nodes are in operation if non-listening nodes are included.

Dashjr stated in a Twitter post that the inscriptions used by Ordinals and BRC-20 were using a vulnerability within Bitcoin Core in an attempt to "spam the blockchain". Dashjr argues that inscriptions congest the network, complicating the mining process and the network’s overall support. For that reason, Dashjr maintains an alternative client to Bitcoin Core called Bitcoin Knots which filters certain transactions, such as inscriptions and ordinals, which go above the default maximum 42-byte datacarrier size limit (this dictates the maximum size of data in data carrier transactions that get relayed and mined). Bitcoin Knots is the node software used by Ocean mining.

== Personal life ==
In 2023, Luke Dashjr's Bitcoin wallet, containing 216.93 bitcoin, was stolen. Dashjr believes a cybercriminal obtained his PGP key, which then led to a compromise of his hot wallet.

== See also ==
- Nayib Bukele
- Bitcoin and politics
- Bitcoin Law
