= Bundle Africa =

Cryptocurrency and payment platform

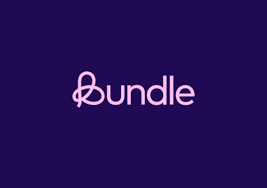
- Type: Privately held company
- Industry: Financial Services
- Founded: August 2019
- Founders: Yele Bademosi
- Defunct: September 1, 2023
- Fate: Defunct
- Area served: Africa (Ghana, Nigeria)
- Key people: Emmanuel Babalola, CEO
- Products: Cryptocurrency exchange, cryptocurrencies
- Number of employees: 11-50 (2021)
- Website: bundle.africa (archived)

Bundle Africa, also known as Bundle, was a social payment software for user trading of cryptocurrencies, facilitating the sending and receiving of fiat, and user savings in dollars and other currencies.

== History ==
Bundle was launched in August 2019 by Yele Bademosi. The following month, it raised $450,000 in seed financing from Binance, Pave Investments, and other African investors. The cryptocurrency exchange was developed as was a remote-first startup company, incubated within the Binance ecosystem.

Bademosi was formerly the director of Binance Labs, the crypto platform's venture arm, where he was responsible for creating Africa's blockchain ecosystem, a position he held until April 2020. He financed some of the most well-known tech businesses in the crypto industry, including Xend, Yellowcard, Bitsika, and Raise, to mention a few, all of which have gone on to achieve success.

Bundle was a cash and a cryptocurrency social payments' app aimed at driving crypto development on the continent by making it more engaging, convenient to use, and inclusive for Africans. The app had over 50,000 downloads in the first four months following its release, with a 4.4 rating on Google Play and over $4.5 million in transaction volumes. Bundle had a monthly transaction volume of $56 million with over 350,000 customers in its early years.

The service grew to 650,000 users in 16 months, mainly through networking and community marketing, with only a small marketing budget. In February 2021, the Central Bank of Nigeria (CBN) restricted all financial institutions from processing cryptocurrency transactions, therein barring cryptocurrency exchanges from the traditional banking system, which significantly impacted Bundle Africa's business.

Bundle Africa teamed with the Feminist Coalition and The Female Media Network (TEFEM) to offer educational and vocational awards to their respective communities in March 2022, in recognition of International Women's Day. It also sponsored women to pursue free Udemy courses on art, technology, and entertainment. Bundle also launched a webpage in celebration of its second anniversary.

=== Bademosi resignation, 2021 ===
Bademosi stepped down as CEO of Bundle Africa on July 31, 2021, with the intention of exploring other areas in the African crypto community that require more support outside of traditional purchase currency trading, while continuing to drive the adoption of digital currency across Africa and the many economic opportunities that come with it. Emmanuel Babalola, the director of Binance Africa, was appointed to take over Yele's role as CEO.

Yele parted ways with Bundle Africa on friendly terms. He was pleased that Babalola would be taking over, citing his significant contributions to the blockchain ecosystem.

== See also ==
- List of bitcoin companies
