= GHash.io =

Bitcoin mining pool

- Industry: Bitcoin mining pool
- Founded: July 2013
- Headquarters: Netherlands
- Area served: Worldwide
- Website: ghash.io

GHash.io was a bitcoin mining pool subsidiary of CEX.io that operated from 2013 to 2016. The pool gained notoriety for briefly controlling more than half of bitcoin's computing power in 2014 (notable in that bitcoin was supposedly outside any party's control).

== History ==
GHash.io was founded and owned by CEX.io, a cryptocurrency exchange that continues to operate today. Apart from mining bitcoin, GHash.io hosted a multipool for mining altcoins, as well as separate pools for mining Litecoin, Dogecoin, Auroracoin, and Darkcoin. Altcoin mining options were available for independent miners, while bitcoin mining could also be done in the cloud by purchasing cloud-based mining power on CEX.io.

Traders on CEX.io could buy shares of GHash.io mining hardware to operate on the GHash.io mining pool. After GHash.io closed in 2016, CEX.io continued operating as a bitcoin exchange.

== 51% attack controversy ==
The possibility of a 51% attack was feared due to the popularity of GHash.io's mining pool. This kind of attack occurs when a single miner or mining pool is able to mine multiple bitcoin block rewards in a row. This would be a problem for the bitcoin network, because it hypothetically allows the mining pool to double-spend (counterfeit) bitcoins. In July 2014, the GHash.io mining pool briefly exceeded the 51% threshold, which forced the bitcoin community to discuss the possibility of finding a common solution to this threat. The pool developing the majority caused a prominent bitcoin developer Peter Todd to sell half of his holdings. The news reportedly caused bitcoin's price to drop from $633 to $600 at the time.

Since no long-term solution to the 51% problem is known, the participants agreed to implement some temporary measures. GHash.io released a voluntary statement promising that it would not exceed 40% of the overall bitcoin hashrate. Moreover, GHash.io representatives asked other mining pools to follow their example for the sake of the entire bitcoin community. It also stated that a new committee should be created to act as a watchdog against the 51% problem. This committee would include representatives of the mining pools, bitcoin businesses and other specialists in the field.

The 51% discussion received broad coverage in the media, beyond publications which commonly focus on cryptocurrency news ArsTechnica, Bloomberg View, Vice Motherboard, International Business Times.

In March 2015, GHash.io was struck by a crippling DDOS attack, possibly in response to the group breaching 51%. By the end of 2015, GHash.io had stopped its mining activity in response to falling bitcoin prices.
