= Yele Bademosi =

Nigerian entrepreneur

- Occupation: Tech startup founder
- Years active: 2017–present
- Organization(s): Bundle, Nestcoin
- Known for: Startup

Yele Bademosi is a Nigerian entrepreneur. He is the co-founder and former CEO of Bundle which he founded in August 2019. He was also a former director at Binance Labs. He also founded tech start-up Nestcoin, a company that focuses on creating Web3 applications and investing in other startups with similar interests.

== Early life and education ==
Bademosi was born in 1991 and is the only male among his siblings. He attended the University of London for his medical studies but dropped out eventually in favour of building apps because he had an interest in computers even though medicine was his father's preferred field of study for his son.

== Career ==
Bademosi started his career as a manager at Starta, a company dedicated to helping African companies launch by providing education, tools and networking opportunities. In 2017, he founded Microtraction, an angel investing firm for African startups. In 2019, he pitched an idea to Binance on what the cryptocurrency exchange should be doing in Africa and as a result was hired to become the first Director at Binance Labs. While at Binance Labs, he started Bundle Africa, a cryptocurrency startup. In July 2021, Bademosi stepped down as the Bundle CEO to focus on driving digital currency adoption across Africa. In November 2021, along with Taiwo Orilogbon, he co-founded Nestcoin.
