= Cloud mining =

Cryptocurrency mining using a remote data center

Cloud mining is the process of cryptocurrency mining utilizing a remote data center with shared processing power. Cloud mining has been used by ransomware groups and scammers to launder cryptocurrency.

This type of cloud mining enables users to mine bitcoins or alternative cryptocurrencies without managing the hardware. The mining rigs are housed and maintained in a facility owned by mining company and the customer simply needs to register and purchase mining contracts or shares. Since cloud mining is provided as a service, there is generally some cost and this can result in lower returns for the miner.

== Types of hosting ==
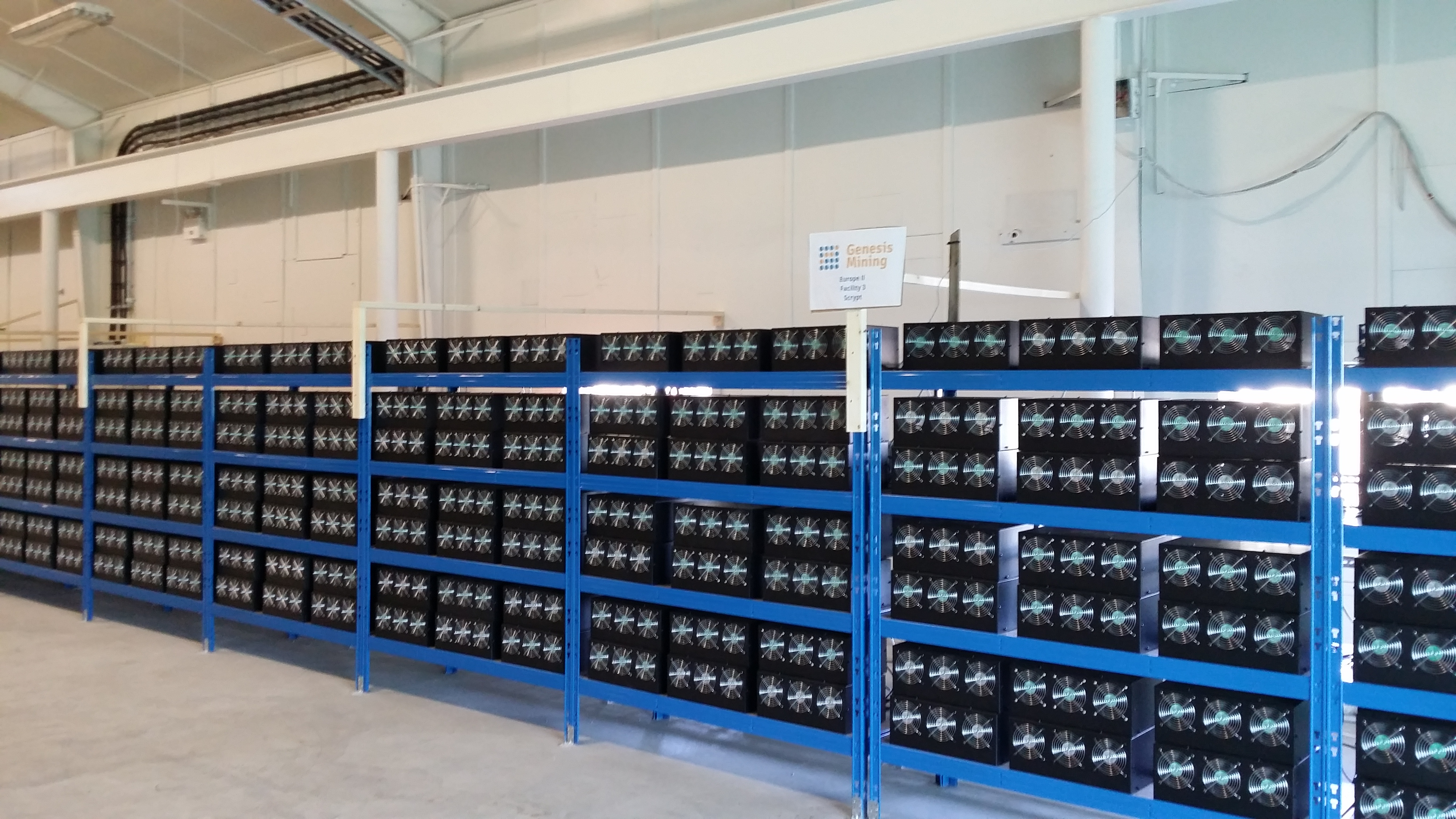
A mining farm located in Iceland. The picture shows scrypt miners.

Users of hosted mining equipment can either lease a physical mining server or a virtual private server and install mining software on the machine. Instead of leasing a dedicated server, some services offer hashing power hosted in data centers for sale denominated in Gigahash/seconds (GH/s); users either select a desired amount of hashing power and a period for the contract or in some cases can trade their hashing power.

== See also ==
- Mining pool
