= Bitcoin and politics =

Interaction between the cryptocurrency Bitcoin and political systems

Bitcoin and politics influence each other in several ways. Governments of several countries use Bitcoin in various capacities, and some politicians use Bitcoin in their electoral programs.

According to the Economist Intelligence Unit, in 2024 cryptocurrency has become a major political campaign topic for the first time, with cryptocurrency industry contributing nearly half of all corporate contributions made during the US presidential elections.

== Use of Bitcoin by governments ==
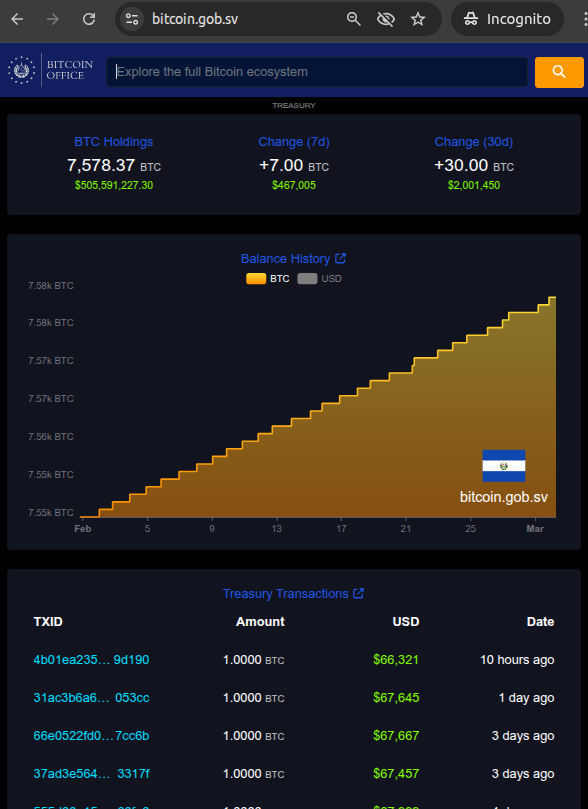
Bitcoin reserves of El Salvador

=== Bitcoin as legal tender ===
In June 2021, the Legislative Assembly of El Salvador voted legislation to make bitcoin legal tender in El Salvador, alongside the US dollar. (Note: According to some reports, the law was approved on 8 June. According to others, it was approved on 9 June. The law was voted during the 8 June parliamentary session, and published in the official journal on 9 June.) The law took effect on 7 September, making El Salvador the first country to do so. The implementation of the law has been met with protests and calls to make the currency optional, not compulsory. According to a survey by the Central American University, the majority of Salvadorans disagreed with using cryptocurrency as a legal tender, and a survey by the Center for Citizen Studies (CEC) showed that 91% of the country prefers the dollar over bitcoin. As of October 2021, the country's government was exploring mining bitcoin with geothermal power and issuing bonds tied to bitcoin. According to a survey done by the Central American University 100 days after the Bitcoin Law came into force: 34.8% of the population has no confidence in bitcoin, 35.3% has little confidence, 13.2% has some confidence, and 14.1% has a lot of confidence. 56.6% of respondents have downloaded the government bitcoin wallet; among them 62.9% has never used it or only once whereas 36.3% uses bitcoin at least once a month. In 2022, the International Monetary Fund (IMF) urged El Salvador to reverse its decision after bitcoin lost half its value in two months. The IMF also warned that it would be difficult to get a loan from the institution. According to one report in 2022, 80% of businesses refused to accept bitcoin despite being legally required to.

In April 2022, the Central African Republic (CAR) adopted Bitcoin as legal tender alongside the CFA franc. After El Salvador, CAR was the second country to do so. In April 2023, CAR agreed to repeal the adoption of Bitcoin as legal tender.

==== Opposition from the IMF ====
Using Keynesianism as its guiding principle, the International Monetary Fund (IMF) strongly opposes the adoption of Bitcoin as legal tender, and has put firm anti-crypto political guidelines into place when negotiating with countries that might require loans from IMF. IMF publicly criticized the adoption of Bitcoin in the Central African Republic, and forced El Salvador to scale back the adoption in exchange for a $1.4 billion loan.

In 2023, IMF announced it was working on a platform for central bank digital currencies (CBDCs). IMF Managing Director Kristalina Georgieva said that if central banks did not agree on a common platform, cryptocurrency would fill the resulting vacuum.

=== Other uses ===
Ukraine accepted donations in cryptocurrency, including bitcoin, to fund the resistance against the Russian invasion. According to officials, 40% of the Ukraine's military suppliers are willing to accept cryptocurrencies without converting them into euros or dollars. In March 2022, Ukraine has passed a law that creates a legal framework for the cryptocurrency industry in the country, including judicial protection of the right to own virtual assets. In the same month, a cryptocurrency exchange was integrated into the Ukrainian e-governance service Diia.

As of 2024, Bhutan, through the country's sovereign investment arm, is running a large-scale bitcoin mining operation, utilizing the country's abundant hydroelectric resources. This allowed Bhutan to accumulate $750 million in bitcoin holdings, representing 28% of the small country's GDP.

Iran announced pending regulations that would require bitcoin miners in Iran to sell bitcoin to the Central Bank of Iran, and the central bank would use it for imports. Iran, as of October 2020, had issued over 1,000 bitcoin mining licenses. The Iranian government initially took a stance against cryptocurrency, but later changed it after seeing that digital currency could be used to circumvent sanctions. The US Office of Foreign Assets Control listed two Iranians and their bitcoin addresses as part of its Specially Designated Nationals and Blocked Persons List for their role in the 2018 Atlanta cyberattack whose ransom was paid in bitcoin.

Some constituent states accept tax payments in bitcoin, including Colorado (US) and Zug (Switzerland).

Bitcoin's immutable ledger is sometimes used to safeguard the results of elections, as in Screven County, Georgia (US) in 2024.

==== The U.S. strategic reserve of cryptocurrencies ====
On July 27, 2024, then presidential candidate Donald Trump spoke at the annual Bitcoin 2024 conference in Nashville, Tennessee in July 2024—a first—announcing that as President he would create a "Strategic National Bitcoin stockpile. In January 2025 as President, he issued an executive order to evaluate such a possibility.

By 2023, the United States had seized $2 billion in bitcoin with most of the cryptocurrency coming from high-profile United States Department of Justice cases such as the November 5, 2020 Silk Road illicit marketplace shutdown, making it one of the world's largest holders of the cryptocurrency, according to Forbes.

On March 2, 2025 Trump announced on Truth Social the names of digital assets he expects to include in the strategic reserve: bitcoin, ether, XRP, solana, and cardano. According to a March 2 CNBC article, this is the first time Trump used the term "Reserve", not "stockpile".

== Bitcoin as a political topic ==
In El Salvador, Nayib Bukele was a presidential candidate from the Grand Alliance for National Unity. After he was elected as the president, the country has approved Bitcoin as a legal tender.

Two presidential candidates for the 2024 United States presidential election, Robert F. Kennedy Jr (Democrat) and Ron DeSantis (Republican), voiced their support for bitcoin. In the previous presidential elections, Andrew Yang was a Democrat candidate strongly supporting bitcoin.

Leaders of several countries voiced their position on bitcoin. Disapproval was voiced by Olaf Scholz (SPD), Joe Biden (Democrat), Donald Trump (Republican). Trump later changed his mind, promised to create a "strategic national Bitcoin stockpile" in the US. Trump's vice-presidential pick, JD Vance, is the first known Bitcoin owner to run for vice-president.

In the US, cryptocurrency donations to political campaigns have been allowed in federal elections since 2014. Additionally, several US states explicitly allow or prohibit such donations for state-level elections. The 2022 re-election campaign of Colorado governor Jared Polis (Democrat) was officially accepting bitcoin and other cryptocurrencies.

According to a 2024 survey by Gemini, more than one-fifth of Americans own cryptocurrency, and 73% of them plan to consider a candidate's stance on crypto when they vote in the election. During the 2024 US elections cycle, cryptocurrency companies contributed one-third of all direct corporate contributions to super PACs, or political action committees; 85% of the congressional candidates supported by the industry won their races, including both Republicans and Democrats. 253 pro-crypto candidates had been elected to the House of Representatives, compared with 115 anti-crypto candidates. In the Senate, 16 pro-crypto candidates and 12 anti-crypto candidates were elected.

== Associated ideologies ==
Satoshi Nakamoto stated in an essay accompanying bitcoin's code that: "The root problem with conventional currencies is all the trust that's required to make it work. The central bank must be trusted not to debase the currency, but the history of fiat currencies is full of breaches of that trust."

=== Austrian economics roots ===
The very first mined block of Bitcoin contains a message: "The Times 03/Jan/2009 Chancellor on brink of second bailout for banks", which refers to a headline in The Times published on 3 January 2009 message, discussing governmental efforts to save large banks from bankruptcy

According to the European Central Bank, the decentralization of money offered by bitcoin has its theoretical roots in the Austrian school of economics, especially with Friedrich von Hayek in his book Denationalisation of Money: The Argument Refined, in which Hayek advocates a complete free market in the production, distribution and management of money to end the monopoly of central banks.

Journalists Paul Vigna and Michael Casey, in their 2015 book The Age of Cryptocurrency, described the libertarian view of bitcoin as closer to metallism, the economic philosophy that views money as a commodity, while they predicted that a larger influence on bitcoin would come from bitcoin's use as a disruptive payment system, which they equate to chartalism.

=== Anarchism and libertarianism ===
According to The New York Times, libertarians and anarchists were attracted to the philosophical idea behind bitcoin. Early bitcoin supporter Roger Ver said: "At first, almost everyone who got involved did so for philosophical reasons. We saw bitcoin as a great idea, as a way to separate money from the state." The Economist describes bitcoin as "a techno-anarchist project to create an online version of cash, a way for people to transact without the possibility of interference from malicious governments or banks".

Nigel Dodd argues in The Social Life of Bitcoin that the essence of the bitcoin ideology is to remove money from social, as well as governmental, control. Dodd quotes a YouTube video, with Roger Ver, Jeff Berwick, Charlie Shrem, Andreas Antonopoulos, Gavin Wood, Trace Meyer and other proponents of bitcoin reading The Declaration of Bitcoin's Independence. The declaration includes a message of crypto-anarchism with the words: "Bitcoin is inherently anti-establishment, anti-system, and anti-state. Bitcoin undermines governments and disrupts institutions because bitcoin is fundamentally humanitarian."

Steve Bannon, who owns a "good stake" in bitcoin, considers it to be "disruptive populism. It takes control back from central authorities. It's revolutionary."

== See also ==
- History of bitcoin
- Economics of bitcoin
- Environmental impact of bitcoin
