= New York State Banking Department =

Regulatory agency (1851–2011)

The New York State Banking Department was created by the New York Legislature on April 15, 1851, with a chief officer to be known as the Superintendent. The New York State Banking Department was the oldest bank regulatory agency in the United States.

The department was the primary regulator for state-licensed and state-chartered financial entities, including domestic banks, foreign agencies, branches and representative offices, savings institutions and trust companies, credit unions and other financial institutions operating in New York including mortgage bankers and brokers, check cashers, money transmitters, and licensed lenders, among others. Total assets of the institutions regulated were nearly $2.2 trillion.

Effective October 3, 2011, Governor Andrew M. Cuomo and the New York State Legislature consolidated the New York State Banking Department and the New York State Insurance Department and created the New York State Department of Financial Services.

== Mission ==
The department's legislative mandate was to insure the safe and sound conduct of these businesses, to conserve assets, to prevent unsound and destructive competition, to maintain public confidence in the banking system, and to protect the public interest and the interests of depositors, creditors and shareholders.

The New York State Banking Department was headquartered at One State Street in New York City and had an office in the state capital at the Empire State Plaza in Albany, New York, and an office in Syracuse, New York to serve the most Northern and Western parts of the State.

Revenues to fund the department's operating budget were derived from fees paid to it by state-chartered institutions. The department was included in the New York State Executive Budget, and all expenses were paid by the New York State Comptroller out of State funds, reimbursed by the amounts assessed against the institutions subject to supervision. Expenses of examination and operation were paid entirely by the institutions subject to regulation.

== Employees ==
The Banking Department was headed by a Superintendent appointed by the Governor of New York. Almost 73 percent of the agency's nearly 600 full-time employees were bank examiners.

== The Banking Board ==
The Banking Board was established in 1932 by N.Y.S. Banking Law § 13 and 14, and was a quasi-legislative body. The Banking Board was created to advise and cooperate with the Banking Department in the formulation of banking standards and regulations and to exercise power to approve or disapprove the issuance of bank charters and licenses and the establishment of branch banks. The Board's powers were broad and affected many aspects of banking supervision.

In 2011, Governor Andrew M. Cuomo and the New York State Legislature abolished the Banking Board as part of the consolidation of the Banking Department and New York State Insurance Department and the creation of the New York State Department of Financial Services.

=== Banking Board membership ===
The Board had seventeen members. The Superintendent of Banks was the Board's chairperson and executive head. Each of the other 16 members were appointed by the governor and approved by the senate for a three-year term. Eight were public members, while the other eight had to have banking experience and had to represent various segments of the banking community.

Members with banking experience were selected, one from each of the following eight groups:

Group one: banks, trust companies and private bankers located in the city of New York and having total assets of one billion dollars or more, as shown in their last report to the Superintendent.

Group two: banks, trust companies and private bankers located outside the city of New York and having total assets of one hundred fifty million dollars or more, as shown in their last report to the Superintendent.

Group three: banks, trust companies and private bankers other than those in group one and group two.

Group four: savings banks located in the city of New York and the counties of Westchester, Rockland, Nassau and Suffolk.

Group five: savings banks other than those in group four.

Group six: savings and loan associations.

Group seven: credit unions.

Group eight: foreign banking corporations licensed to maintain a branch or agency in the state. The member from this group must be a resident of the state but need not be a citizen of the United States.

== Unique undertakings of the Banking Department ==
Banking Development District (BDD) Program:

Section 96-d of the Banking Law, entitled 'Banking Development Districts' addresses a program created to encourage the establishment of bank branches in areas with a demonstrated need for banking services, with the goals of stimulating local economies and helping more New Yorkers enter the financial mainstream.

Banks partner with local governments to establish a BDD in an under-banked neighborhood, and, when approved by the Banking Department, are eligible to receive municipal deposits at below-market interest rates from the State.

The Enriched BDD program was launched in early 2005 to better coordinate the Banking Department and Comptroller’s Office with other community development and capacity-building initiatives. The Enriched BDD program also targets underbanked New York City neighborhoods and invites banks to apply for BDD branches in the pre-designated areas.

Holocaust Claims Processing Office

Created in 1997, the HCPO helps claimants from around the world obtain just resolution for the theft of property during the Holocaust—specifically, assets deposited in European banks, monies never paid in connection with insurance policies issued by European insurers, and lost or looted art. HCPO is co-financed by the NYS Insurance Department, and has responded to over 10,600 inquiries, resulting in 4,746 claims from 44 states and 42 countries.

Criminal Investigations Bureau

The department's Criminal Investigations Bureau (CIB) provides specialized investigatory capabilities with respect to allegations of criminal activity involving the financial industry and works cooperatively with law enforcement organizations at the local, state and federal levels. CIB also houses a team of examiners who specialize in compliance with anti-money-laundering laws, such as the bank Secrecy Act. This unit identifies and mitigates threats to the financial industry stemming from money laundering and terrorist financing.

Mortgage Fraud Unit

The Criminal Investigations Bureau has a Mortgage Fraud Unit. They conduct coordinated reviews with the Department of State, a HALT member agency that oversees real estate appraisers. The department compiles data on New York mortgages and ensures that homeowners facing foreclosure receive information about available counseling services. The department conducted several foreclosure forums in 2008. The Banking Department provided $2 million in grants for foreclosure prevention, with money provided from settlements received from prior predatory lending enforcement actions.

New York participates in the National Mortgage Licensing System (NMLS), a state-run project that registers lenders. The department estimated that 20,000 lenders would be registered by January 2010.

== Other activities ==
ATM inspections

The Banking Department is responsible for inspecting ATM facilities for compliance with the requirements of the ATM Safety Act. This includes requirements for surveillance cameras, adequate lighting, key-card access and an unobstructed view of the facility from the street. This law applies not only to state chartered entities, but to all federally chartered banks, trust companies, savings banks, savings and loan associations or credit unions, as long as they operate one or more ATMs in New York, whether the entity is headquartered in New York or not. The Banking Department has 13 ATM safety inspectors.

Name approvals

Under Section 301 of the Business Corporation Law and analogous sections of the Not-for-Profit Corporation Law, the Limited Liability Company Law and Limited Partnership Act, the Banking Department and the Insurance Department (as appropriate) must approve the use of certain words (or abbreviations or derivatives thereof) in the name of an entity. The Banking Department approves the terms acceptance, bank, finance, investment, loan, mortgage, savings and trust. During the first 7 ½ months of 2007, the department ruled on over 600 such applications.

Consumer services

The mission of the Banking Department's Consumer Services Division is to ensure that regulated institutions abide by the consumer protection, fair lending and community reinvestment requirements of the Banking Law and regulations. The division also strives to increase consumer access to traditional banking services in under-served communities by administering the department's Banking Development District program and other community development initiatives. Finally, the Consumer Services Division runs a consumer help unit to resolve problems between consumers and regulated entities.

Consumer Help Unit

CHU was created in May 2005 in order to give New York consumers a single point of contact for learning about important banking-related issues, making inquiries and filing complaints. Its management falls to the Deputy Superintendent of CMR.

== Nature of state regulation ==
Regulation by the Banking Department begins with chartering, in the case of banks, trust companies and thrifts, licensing in the case of most other entities, and registration in the case of mortgage brokers.

For all entities, it involves an evaluation of the character and fitness of incorporators (for chartered entities), directors and officers. For banking entities, it also involves requirements as to corporate governance and limitations on corporate powers.

For most entities, it also involves financial requirements, such as a requirement as to minimum net capital. Banking organizations are also subject to restrictions on payment of dividends as well as restrictions on transactions with affiliates and loans to any one borrower. For all entities, it involves the requirement to maintain accurate books and records of its financial condition and transactions, as well as regular examination by the department’s examination staff, which ranges from continuous on-site examination for the largest entities, to discrete examinations at appropriate intervals.

Under the Banking Law, the Superintendent may require a regulated entity to appear and explain any apparent violation of law, issue an order directing a regulated entity to discontinue unauthorized or unsafe practices or to make good an impairment of capital or, in the case of a banking organization, required reserves, or to improve its recordkeeping.

The Superintendent may take possession of and liquidate a banking organization and may suspend or revoke a certificate or license to do business or certain activities of a regulated non-banking entity. It holds in trust any unclaimed assets of a liquidated bank.

Finally, under Section 44 of the Banking Law, following notice and a hearing, the Superintendent may impose penalties to be paid to the State.

== Scope ==
The following is a brief description of each of type of entity regulated by the Department:

Banks & trust companies The Banking Department charters and regulates banks and trust companies under Article III of the Banking Law. Historically, the Banking Department regulated both large domestic banks and smaller community and regional banks. However, the number of large domestic banks with state charters has been greatly reduced as a result of (i) mergers and (ii) “flipping” to federal charters by banks with operations in numerous other states who wanted to take advantage of a single set of nationwide federal rules, rather than complying with the consumer protection laws of all 50 states.

A trust company (which may be a stand-alone entity or be part of a bank that also conducts a general banking business) is an entity that is authorized by the Superintendent to exercise fiduciary (trust) powers.

Budget planners A budget planner is a non-profit corporation that enters into a contract with a debtor under which the debtor agrees to pay a sum of money periodically to the budget planner, which the budget planner distributes among the debtor’s creditors. A budget planner also provides credit counseling and financial education. Section 456 of the General Business Law prohibits budget planning by anyone other than a non-profit corporation. Budget planners are licensed by the Banking Department under Article XII-C of the Banking Law.

Check cashers A check casher is a person whose primary business is the cashing of checks, drafts or money orders for a fee. (A license is not required when a person cashes checks, drafts or money orders without charge, or when the person cashes checks, drafts or money orders as an incident to the conduct of another lawful business (e.g. a store) and not more than $1.00 is charged.) Check cashers are licensed by the Superintendent of Banks under Article IX-A of the Banking Law.

Credit unions There are two forms of credit unions under Article 11 of the Banking Law. A credit union is a non-stock corporation (i.e. a membership corporation) whose members must either have a common employer or be members of the same trade, industry, profession, club, union, society or other association. Credit unions accept deposits from, make loans to and issue credit cards to their members, among other things. A corporate credit union is a credit union whose members are primarily other credit unions. New York state-chartered credit unions are also regulated by the National Credit Union Administration, which also insures credit union share accounts up to certain limits.

Foreign banks (branches, agencies and representative offices) A New York branch is an office of a foreign bank that is licensed by the Superintendent to conduct a banking business in New York. A branch may exercise the same powers as a state-chartered commercial bank, including accepting deposits, making loans, issuing letters of credit, dealing in foreign exchange, making acceptances and, if authorized, exercising fiduciary powers. There are two types of foreign branches – insured and uninsured. An insured branch may conduct a retail banking business in New York, making consumer loans and accepting consumer deposits. An uninsured branch may accept deposits only as authorized by the FDIC Rules, with disclosure of their non-insured status. Since FDICIA was passed in 1991, no new insured branches have been allowed.

A New York agency has many of the same powers as a branch, except in the case of deposits. An agency may issue large-denomination ($100,000 or over) CDs, may accept deposits from foreign residents and citizens and may maintain credit balances for customers incidental to its banking business.

A foreign bank wishing merely to solicit business in the U.S. may establish a representative office to conduct research on the U.S. market and engage in marketing for the foreign bank. A representative office is not permitted to perform any core banking functions for the foreign bank or make any business decisions that would obligate the foreign bank, but it is permitted to engage in a number of activities not deemed to constitute the business of banking, including acting as liaison with customers and correspondents of the foreign bank, soliciting new business for the foreign bank, soliciting investors to buy loans from the foreign bank, and soliciting loans of $250,000 or more for the foreign bank.

Branches and agencies are covered in Article V of the Banking Law. Representative offices are covered in Article V-B of the Banking Law. Since 1991, they have also been subject to supervision by the Federal Reserve Board.

Holding companies For purposes of the Banking Law, a bank holding company is an entity (or natural person) that owns 10% or more of the voting stock, or otherwise controls, two or more New York banks or trust companies or national banks whose principal offices are located in New York State. Regulation of bank holding companies under Article III-A of the Banking Law is designed to prevent undue concentration of bank ownership. Consequently, unlike the Federal Reserve Board, which regulates all holding companies, even if they control only one bank, the Banking Department does not regulate one-bank holding companies.

Investment companies (Article XII) An Article XII Investment company is a specialized non-depository lending institution that has broad borrowing and lending powers and may invest in stocks. An Article XII investment company may not accept “deposits” inside the U.S., although it may accept credit balances in New York that are incidental to the exercise of its other powers. Several foreign banks maintain Article XII investment companies. In addition, several large U.S. financial companies, including American Express, AIG, General Electric and Western Union, also have chartered Article XII investment companies.

Licensed lenders A licensed lender is an entity engaged in the business of making loans in the principal amount of (i) $25,000 or less to any individual for personal, family, household, or investment purposes, or (ii) $50,000 or less for business and commercial loans, and which charges a rate of interest greater than 16% per annum.

Money transmitters The business of money transmission includes the issuance and sale of traveler’s checks, issuance and sale of money orders, and the transmission of money on behalf of the public by any means including transmissions within this country or abroad by wire, check, draft, facsimile or courier. Generally, a money transmitter markets its services through a network of agents. Money transmitters are covered in Article XIII-B of the Banking Law.

Mortgage bankers A mortgage banker is a person who engages in the business of making five or more mortgage loans in any one calendar year (other than certain exempted entities, including a banking organization and an insurance company). Mortgage bankers are subject to licensing by the Superintendent of Banks under Article XII-D of the Banking Law.

Mortgage brokers A mortgage broker is a person who solicits, processes, places or negotiates a mortgage loan, but does not include a real estate broker or salesman, as defined in section 440 of the Real Property Law, if he does not directly or indirectly accept a fee for services rendered in connection with such solicitation, processing, placement or negotiation. Mortgage brokers are subject to registration by the Superintendent of banks under Article XII-D of the Banking Law.

Mortgage loan originators Under legislation passed in 2006 regulates mortgage loan originators (MLOs), who are individuals employed by or who have an independent contractor relationship with licensed mortgage bankers or registered mortgage brokers and who assist customers by soliciting, negotiating, explaining or finalizing the terms of a mortgage loan. MLOs are subject to a criminal background check and must complete certain educational requirements. MLOs are assessed fees that cover the cost of administering the registration program. MLOs are covered by Article XII-E of the banking Law.

Premium finance companies A premium finance company enters into premium finance agreements with an insured person or acquires premium finance agreements from insurance agents or brokers or other premium finance agencies. A premium finance agreement is an arrangement under which a premium finance agency or an insurance broker or agent advances funds to an insurance company to pay an insurance premium on behalf of the insured and receives repayment by the insured over a period of time. Under Article XII-B of the Banking Law, the Banking Department licenses insurance finance agencies and regulates the terms of the finance agreement.

Private bankers A private bank is a bank owned by an individual or a partnership. A private bank may engage generally in the full range of commercial banking activities, as well as in investment banking activities.

Safe deposit companies A safe deposit company acts as a custodian for storage of personal property and papers of any kind. It may also engage in the safe deposit business by renting vaults and safe deposit boxes. It cannot lend money or make advances on any property left in its possession. Safe Deposit Companies and the safe deposit business are covered in Articles VIII and VIII-A of the Banking Law.

Sales finance companies A sales finance company acquires retail installment contracts or other credit agreements made by other parties. The term also includes a retail car dealer who holds retail installment contracts acquired from retail buyers, which have aggregate unpaid time balances of $25,000 or more. The term also includes a person who enters into retail installment credit agreements with retail buyers under Section 413(11) of the Personal Property Law. The Banking Department licenses persons to engage as sales finance companies (other than banks, savings bank, savings and loan associations, trust companies, private bankers or investment companies or licensed lenders) under Article XI-B of the Banking Law.

Savings banks and savings & loan associations A savings bank or a savings and loan association is a type of financial institution whose main purpose is to take deposits from consumers and to make home mortgage loans or to invest in home mortgages. Some institutions also invest in commercial mortgages. Historically, savings banks were organized as mutual companies and savings and loan associations (S&Ls) were organized as stock companies. Savings banks and S&Ls are regulated, respectively, under Article 6 and Article 10 of the Banking Law. Deposits of each type of institution are insured by the Federal Deposit Insurance Corporation.

To view the alphabetical listing of the history of many of the Banks and Trust Companies, Savings Banks, Savings and Loans, Credit Unions, Investment Companies that are or were state chartered, as well as most federally chartered institutions that have operated in the state of New York go to http://www.banking.state.ny.us/history.htm

== State regulator associations ==
National Association of State Credit Union Supervisors

State credit union regulators formed NASCUS in 1965 to ensure the safety and soundness of state-chartered credit unions. NASCUS, a professional regulators association, is the primary resource and voice of the 48 state governmental and U.S. territorial agencies that charter, regulate and examine the nation’s state-chartered credit unions. (Delaware, South Dakota and Wyoming have no laws permitting state-chartered credit unions.) NASCUS is the only organization dedicated to the defense and promotion of the dual chartering system and the autonomy of state credit union regulatory agencies.”

Today, NASCUS also represents the interests of state agencies before Congress and is the liaison to federal agencies, including the National Credit Union Administration (NCUA). NCUA is the chartering authority for federal credit unions and the administrator of the National Credit Union Share Insurance Fund (NCUSIF), the insurer of most state-chartered credit unions. NASCUS also provides examiner education programs for state agencies.

New York State Credit Union League

Conference of State Bank Supervisors (CSBS)

CSBS is a national advocate for the state banking system. Its membership consists of state bank regulators, commissioners, etc. from all 50 states. Its mission is to educate, coordinate, advocate and communicate for the advancement of the state banking system.
