= Paxos (company) =

Financial technology company

Paxos Trust Company
- Formerly: itBit
- Type: Limited purpose trust company
- Industry: Financial technology
- Founded: 2012; 14 years ago
- Headquarters: New York, NY
- Key people: Charles Cascarilla (CEO and co-founder); Rich Teo (CEO of Paxos Asia and co-founder)
- Website: paxos.com

Paxos Trust Company, N.A. (doing business as Paxos) is a blockchain infrastructure company, stablecoin issuer, and chartered national bank headquartered in New York City. The company provides digital asset brokerage, issuance, custody, and settlement services to enterprise clients in financial services. Paxos has also issued multiple U.S. dollar-backed stablecoins, including PayPal USD (PYUSD), Pax Dollar (USDP), and Global Dollar (USDG). ItBit, a bitcoin exchange run by Paxos, was the first bitcoin exchange to be licensed by the New York State Department of Financial Services, granting the company the ability to be the custodian and exchange for customers in the United States.

Paxos was founded in 2012 and is based in New York City with offices in London and Singapore. As of April 2021, the company has received $540 million in funding.

== History ==
Charles Cascarilla and Rich Teo founded Paxos in 2012 as the itBit bitcoin exchange. In 2015, the company changed its legal name from itBit to Paxos Trust Company. At the same time, the New York State Department of Financial Services granted Paxos a limited-purpose trust charter, making it one of the first companies in the U.S. approved and regulated to offer crypto products and services.

The company received $65 million in a funding round in May 2018. In September 2018, Paxos launched the Paxos Standard stablecoin as one of the first regulated stablecoins. Paxos introduced PAX Gold, a regulated gold-backed digital token, in September 2019.

In October 2019, the U.S. Securities and Exchange Commission (SEC) issued a no-action letter allowing Paxos to pilot a blockchain-based settlement service for U.S. equities; the service launched in February 2020. In July 2020, Paxos launched its crypto brokerage, with Revolut as the first client.

In October 2020, PayPal announced that it would offer cryptocurrency buy, hold, and sell services to its users through a partnership with Paxos.

In September 2022, Canada-based multi-asset retail financial trading services provider OANDA collaborated with Paxos to develop a crypto trading ecosystem. On 20 October 2022, OANDA launched a crypto trading function on its forex trading platform in partnership with Paxos. The partnership allows U.S.-based clients of OANDA to trade cryptocurrencies on Paxos' itBit exchange through the OANDA mobile app.

In June 2025, Paxos launched Paxos Labs, a startup incubated within the company to help institutions integrate decentralized finance (DeFi) and on-chain products into their platforms.

In November 2025, it was announced that Paxos had acquired the New York-headquartered multi-party computation (MPC) digital wallet and custody technology startup Fordefi for an undisclosed amount.

In December 2025, the U.S. Office of the Comptroller of the Currency (OCC) conditionally approved Paxos Trust Company’s application to convert its state trust charter into a national trust bank charter, subject to meeting the regulator’s conditions.

=== Lobbying and political influence ===
In 2025, Charles and Marissa Cascarilla were among the donors who funded the White House's East Wing demolition and planned ballroom construction.

== Products ==
=== Crypto brokerage ===
Paxos provides a crypto brokerage service that enables clients to offer their customers access to cryptocurrency markets. The company manages the regulatory and technological aspects of cryptocurrency trading on behalf of its clients.

=== Pax Dollar ===
Paxos Standard (PAX), later renamed Pax Dollar (USDP), was launched in September 2018 and was among the first regulated stablecoins in the industry. It is pegged to the U.S. dollar at a 1:1 ratio.

=== PAX Gold ===
PAX Gold (PAXG) is a digital asset backed by physical gold. Paxos Trust Company serves as the custodian for PAX Gold tokens and the corresponding physical gold bars.

=== PayPal USD (PYUSD) ===
In August 2023, Paxos began issuing PayPal USD (PYUSD), a U.S. dollar-denominated stablecoin for PayPal, as a token on the Ethereum blockchain. PayPal stated that PYUSD is backed by U.S. dollar deposits, short-term U.S. Treasury securities, and similar cash equivalents, and is redeemable on a 1:1 basis for U.S. dollars. In May 2024, PayPal announced that PYUSD would also become available on the Solana blockchain.

=== itBit ===
itBit is a digital asset exchange approved by the New York State Department of Financial Services
