= Bitwala =

- Type: GmbH (private)
- Industry: Cryptocurrency, Financial technology
- Founded: 2015; 11 years ago
- Founders: Jörg von Minckwitz, Jan Goslicki, Benjamin P. Jones
- Headquarters: Am Treptower Park 75, 12435 Berlin, Germany
- Area served: European Economic Area (29 countries)
- Key people: Dennis Daiber (CEO), Jan Goslicki (CXO / Co-Founder)
- Products: Self-custodial Bitcoin wallet, Visa debit card, crypto trading, crypto-backed loans, BWALA equity token
- Website: bitwala.com

Bitwala is a Berlin-based cryptocurrency financial services company offering a self-custodial Bitcoin wallet, a Visa debit card, crypto trading, and crypto-backed loans. The company was founded in 2015 by Jörg von Minckwitz, Jan Goslicki, and Benjamin P. Jones. After operating briefly under the name Nuri from 2021 to 2022, the company returned to the Bitwala brand in late 2023 following insolvency proceedings.

== History ==
=== Founding and early product (2015–2018) ===
Bitwala launched in October 2015 as a blockchain-based payment service provider headquartered in Berlin. The company used digital currencies to facilitate international money transfers, offering SEPA and SWIFT transfers by converting Bitcoin or altcoins into over 20 fiat currencies, reaching bank accounts in more than 200 countries.

In January 2018, Bitwala's services were disrupted when its prepaid card provider, WaveCrest Holdings Ltd, had its Visa licence revoked by the Gibraltar Financial Services Commission over compliance failings. Several other cryptocurrency card issuers, including CryptoPay, TenX and Wirex, were affected by the same decision.

=== Relaunch as blockchain bank (2018–2021) ===
Bitwala joined the European Fintech Alliance in August 2018. In September 2018, the company raised €4 million from venture capital investors Earlybird and Coparion. In October 2018, Bitwala announced a partnership with Berlin-based Solarisbank, and in November it relaunched with what the company described as Europe's first regulated blockchain banking solution, combining Bitcoin and euro deposits in a single German bank account hosted by solarisBank.

In July 2019, Bitwala raised a further €13 million (approximately $14.5 million) in a Series A funding round led by Sony Financial Ventures and NKB Group, with additional participation from Earlybird and Coparion. By early 2021, Bitwala had grown to more than 200,000 customers across 32 European countries, and was described as the third-largest neobank in Germany.

=== Rebrand to Nuri and insolvency (2021–2022) ===
In May 2021, Bitwala rebranded to Nuri, shifting its positioning toward a broader neobank offering. During the same period the company scaled to approximately 250 employees while pursuing a banking licence.

Nuri filed for insolvency on 9 August 2022, citing liquidity difficulties triggered by the crypto bear market following the collapse of Terra/Luna, Celsius, and FTX. The company stated that customer funds and investments held at partner bank solarisBank were unaffected. Operations ceased in October 2022, and Nuri's customer base was subsequently transferred to Vivid Money, a Germany-based neobank.

=== Return as Bitwala (2023–present) ===
In November 2023, the company relaunched under its original Bitwala name in partnership with Striga, an Estonia-based Banking and Crypto-as-a-Service provider and subsidiary of Lastbit. Through Striga, Bitwala obtained compliant crypto trading and card-issuing infrastructure without the regulatory burden of a full banking licence.

In February 2024, Bitwala closed its first post-relaunch funding round from Blockchain Founders Fund, raising its valuation from €3.5 million to over €5 million.

The current entity is registered as Bitwala GmbH (HRB 234888 B, Amtsgericht Charlottenburg), with Dennis Daiber and Jan Goslicki serving as managing directors.

In June 2026 Bitwala stated that they would be transferring the Nuri brand to new owners who will run it independently.

== Funding ==
Date	Round	Amount	Lead investors
September 2018	Seed	€4 million	Earlybird, Coparion
July 2019	Series A	€13 million	Sony Financial Ventures, NKB Group
February 2024	Post-restart	Undisclosed	Blockchain Founders Fund

Total funding raised across all rounds prior to insolvency was approximately €42.3 million. The February 2024 post-restart round raised the company's valuation to over €5 million.
