= LocalBitcoins =

Bitcoin platform in Finland

- Founded: June 2012
- Founder: Jeremias Kangas
- Defunct: February 2023
- Headquarters: Helsinki, Finland
- Area served: Worldwide
- Key people: Sara Leppänen (CEO); Nikolaus Kangas (former CEO); Jeremias Kangas (former CEO)
- Number of employees: 100+
- Website: localbitcoins.com

LocalBitcoins was a peer-to-peer bitcoin exchange platform based in Helsinki, Finland.

== History ==
LocalBitcoins was founded in June 2012 by Jeremias Kangas. He implemented an escrow system for the marketplace by the end of 2012. The website started generating revenue by the beginning of 2013, and in 2020 there was an average of 29,566 successful trades per day.

In 2018, LocalBitcoins headed the list of best financially performing companies in Finland arranged by the local specialized publication Kauppalehti.

In 2014, 2016, and 2018 people who used the site were arrested for money laundering and related crimes.

In January 2019, attackers stole bitcoin worth $28,200 from users' LocalBitcoins accounts. LocalBitcoins was able to identify and solve the case immediately, announcing it to its users. On the same day, LocalBitcoins shared that LocalBitcoins accounts were safe to use and emphasized the importance of two-factor authentication.

In March 2019, following the approval of new Finnish legislation on virtual currency service providers, LocalBitcoins began introducing enhanced anti-money laundering (AML) and know-your-customer (KYC) measures, including a new registration process that required users to verify basic identity information.

In November 2019, LocalBitcoins.com got registered as a Virtual Currency Provider by the Finnish Financial Supervisory Authority.

On 9 February 2023, LocalBitcoins announced it would cease operations later in February.

In June 2025, LocalBitcoins was imposed an €500,000 penalty by the Finnish Financial Supervisory Authority in 2025 for deficiencies in customer due diligence and identity verification that occurred during its last years of operation.

== Operations ==
LocalBitcoins began as a service to facilitate the locating of Bitcoin users, who could meet for person-to-person trading of bitcoin. The site was suggested for casual traders seeking more privacy. The site used an escrow system, and the transfer of bitcoin was made after funds were received in the seller's account. LocalBitcoins had a reputation system for users and an escrow and conflict resolution service.

Later, it facilitated over-the-counter trading of local currency for bitcoins. Users posted advertisements on the website, where they stated exchange rates and payment methods for buying or selling bitcoins.
