= Digital Currency Group =

American venture capital company

Digital Currency Group Inc.
- Type: Private
- Industry: Asset management
- Founded: 2015; 11 years ago
- Founder: Barry Silbert
- Headquarters: Stamford, Connecticut
- Area served: Worldwide
- Key people: Barry Silbert (CEO); Mark Shifke (CFO)
- Products: Investment funds
- AUM: $50 billion (Sept. 2021)
- Subsidiaries: Foundry; Yuma; Fortitude Mining; Grayscale Investments; Luno
- Website: dcg.co

Digital Currency Group Inc. (DCG) is an American investment company focusing on the digital currency market and decentralized technologies. It is headquartered in Stamford, Connecticut. The subsidiaries include Grayscale Investments, Yuma, Foundry, Luno, and Fortitude Mining. It also formerly owned the now-inactive Genesis Global Holdco and CoinDesk.

== History ==
=== Founding and growth: 2015–2021 ===
DCG was launched in 2015 by Barry Silbert, the former CEO of SecondMarket, Inc., following Nasdaq's acquisition of the company that year. Silbert began investing in blockchain technology companies in 2013 and launched the Bitcoin Investment Trust, one of the first publicly traded Bitcoin investment vehicles. Grayscale and Genesis were the company's first subsidiaries. When DCG launched its new subsidiary Yuma in November 2024, Silbert became its CEO.

In November 2021, the firm relocated its Manhattan headquarters to Stamford, Connecticut. Connecticut governor Ned Lamont offered financial incentives for the company to move to Stamford, including a $5 million grant if DCG created at least 300 full-time jobs in the state.

As of November 2021, Digital Currency Group made over 200 investments in other cryptocurrency companies.

=== 2023–present ===
By early 2023, DCG had over 160 companies in its portfolio. Subsidiaries included the crypto exchange Luno, and the firm Foundry for crypto mining. It was also an early investor in Coinbase and Kraken, the firm Circle behind the stablecoin USDC, and the analytics companies Chainalysis, Dune Analytics, Elliptic, and Etherscan. In early 2023, Barry Silbert opposed Cameron Winklevoss's call for him to be replaced as CEO.

In January 2023, the Financial Times reported that DCG was considering selling parts of its venture capital holdings to raise funds.

On January 19, 2023, Genesis Global Capital filed for Chapter 11 bankruptcy protection, citing over 100,000 creditors and liabilities of between $1 billion and $10 billion. In February 2023, DCG struck a deal with creditors to either sell its Genesis unit or turn its equity over to creditors. Specifically, on February 6, 2023, Genesis Global Holdco announced a possible agreement with its creditors and DCG, wherein DCG would give its equity interest in Genesis Global Trading (GGT) to Genesis Global Holdco. DCG would also refinance its loans from Genesis and exchange its existing $1.1 billion promissory note for convertible preferred stock issued by DCG. However, in April, some creditors walked away from the restructuring agreement.

In mid-May 2023, it was reported that DCG had missed a $630 million payment to Genesis, while owing the company $1.65 billion. In January 2024, DCG completed payment of these short-term loans to Genesis.

DCG stated that "due to the state of the broader economy and prolonged crypto winter, along with the challenging regulatory environment for digital assets in the U.S," it shut down TradeBlock, an institutional trading platform, on May 31, 2023. At that time, Luno was still owned by DCG. In July 2023, it was reported that DCG would sell CoinDesk for $125 million. At the time, DCG had closed HQ, its wealth management unit. With Barry Silbert remaining CEO, in July 2023, DCG appointed Mark Shifke as its CFO.

In July 2023, DCG's crypto lending arm Genesis Global was still undergoing bankruptcy proceedings. In July 2023, Gemini sued DCG in New York, citing fraud, with the intent of reclaiming funds. In August 2023 DCG reportedly faced an unannounced probe by the New York Attorney General, who was seeking information related to the financial dealings of DCG's subsidiary Genesis.

A new Chapter 11 deal was agreed on with DCG and lender Genesis Global, as well as a major creditor group, in late August 2023. The agreement involved paying out up to 90% of the amount owed to Genesis customers using new loans.

In October 2023, the New York attorney general filed a lawsuit against DCG, Gemini Trust, and Genesis Capital for allegedly defrauding more than 230,000 investors of more than $1.1 billion. The companies allegedly lied to investors about the expected returns on their investments and regarding their safety, while also concealing losses from them and the public. DCG replied that they would fight the claims, and that they were "shocked by the baseless allegations." The bankruptcy proceedings continued until May 2024, when the US Bankruptcy Court for the Southern District of New York Court formally approved the finalized Genesis bankruptcy restructuring plan. Genesis' restructuring was completed in August 2024, and it began distributions valued on an in-kind basis to creditors of around $4 billion.

== Subsidiaries ==
=== Grayscale Investments ===
Established in 2013, Grayscale Investments is a digital currency asset manager. It offers funds privately for institutional and accredited investors and publicly traded products.

Grayscale was the world's largest asset manager for digital currency, as of December 2021, with more than $50 billion in assets under management. Grayscale also manages the Grayscale Bitcoin Investment Trust (OTCQX: GBTC), which was the first publicly quoted security solely invested in the price of bitcoin upon its launch in 2013.

As of April 2021, six of Grayscale's funds were traded publicly on the OTCQX market: Bitcoin Cash, Grayscale Bitcoin Trust, Grayscale Ethereum Trust, Grayscale Ethereum Classic Trust, Grayscale Digital Large Cap Fund, and the Grayscale Litecoin Trust.

Grayscale Bitcoin Trust was approved for public trading by the U.S. Financial Industry Regulatory Authority (FINRA) in 2015. On January 21, 2020, Grayscale Bitcoin Trust became the first digital currency financial product to become a Securities and Exchange Commission reporting company.

In 2018, Grayscale launched the Grayscale Digital Large Cap Fund, which allows a customer to invest in a group of prominent digital currencies. The fund was approved to trade on public markets by the FINRA in October 2019. In May 2022, it was reported that Grayscale would list an exchange-traded fund (ETF) for the first time in Europe. The ETF was said to be made up of companies representing the "Future of Finance", and would begin trading on May 17.

In August 2023, Grayscale won a landmark legal victory against the SEC when a U.S. court ruled in favor of the company's petition to convert GBTC into a spot Bitcoin ETF. In January 2024, the SEC granted approval for Grayscale Bitcoin Trust (GBTC) to convert into a spot Bitcoin ETF, along with ten other products including BlackRock's iShares Bitcoin Trust and Fidelity’s Wise Origin Bitcoin Trust. Following that decision, in July 2024 the SEC granted approval for Grayscale's ETHE, along with seven other spot Ethereum ETFs including Bitwise's Ethereum ETF and VanEck's Ethereum Trust. Grayscale also received approval from the SEC for its mini Ethereum exchange-traded fund in July 2024.

Grayscale CEO Michael Sonnenshein stepped down in May 2024, and it was announced that Peter Mintzberg would take on the role of CEO, effective August 2024. Fortune reported that Mintzberg, who previously held senior roles at Goldman Sachs, BlackRock, and Invesco, was brought in as Grayscale sought to "catch up with larger competitors" such as BlackRock and Fidelity following the launch of U.S. Bitcoin ETFs.

=== Genesis Global Capital ===
Launched in 2013, Genesis was a cryptocurrency trading, lending, and asset custody platform, targeting institutional clients and high-net-worth individuals. They claim to have been the first Bitcoin cryptocurrency desk.

Genesis acquired the London-based cryptocurrency custodial company Volt in early 2020. At the time, news media speculated that Grayscale Investments, another subsidiary of DCG, might transfer its cryptocurrency assets to Genesis from Coinbase, which had taken on Grayscale's custody needs through its acquisition of the company Xapo in 2019.

Genesis' sister company, Grayscale Investments, had been holding its cryptocurrency assets with the company Xapo, which had been acquired by Genesis' rival Bitcoin trading company Coinbase in 2019. News media speculated that Genesis' cryptocurrency custody would be transferred away from Coinbase and made internal to Greyscale after completion of the Volt acquisition.

In late June and early July 2022, Genesis publicly disclosed that it was exposed to hundreds of millions of dollars in losses from loans to both the Hong Kong-based cryptocurrency lender Babel Finance and the bankrupt cryptocurrency hedge fund Three Arrows Capital (3AC), and that its parent company DCG had taken on some of Genesis' debts in order to keep the company afloat. On August 17, 2022, Genesis CEO Michael Moro resigned to serve in an advisory position, while Chief Operating Officer (COO) Derar Islim became interim CEO. On November 1, 2022, it was reported that Mark Murphy had been promoted from DCG's COO to president and had dismissed 10% of the DCG staff. On November 16, Genesis abruptly halted all Bitcoin withdrawals and loan applications for their customers, following FTX's bankruptcy filing. The next morning, Wall Street Journal reported that it had obtained confidential documents stating that Genesis had an "ongoing run on deposits". On January 19, 2023, Genesis Global Capital filed for Chapter 11 bankruptcy protection. with the unit continuing to undergo proceedings through 2023. By January 2025, Genesis Global Capital LLC was defunct.

=== CoinDesk ===
CoinDesk is a global media, research, and events platform that was acquired by DCG in 2016. It reports on bitcoin blockchain daily news, provides a bitcoin price index and publishes a quarterly State of Bitcoin report. CoinDesk also hosts a conference on digital currencies and blockchain technologies named Consensus.

CoinDesk retained investment bank Lazard in January 2023 to explore options for a potential or full sale of the media company, which led to its sale in November 2023 from DCG to crypto exchange Bullish in an all-cash deal.

=== Foundry ===
Foundry, established in 2019, sets up and manages bitcoin mining operations in the United States and Canada. In addition to setting up and operating its own cryptocurrency mining equipment, Foundry also provides financing, specialized digital mining equipment, and expertise to other digital currency startups.

In the summer of 2021, Foundry helped to relocate over $300 million worth of equipment from China to North America following the Chinese government shutdown of many cryptocurrency mining operations.

Bloomberg reported in April 2023 that Foundry would stop offering free Bitcoin mining services, and between April 19 and April 22, would instead levy a pool fee on members. The services had been free since 2019. In July 2024, it was reported that Foundry along with crypto mining pool Antpool controlled almost 60% of the Bitcoin mining pool market.

=== Luno ===
Cryptocurrency startup Luno (formally BitX) was founded in 2013 by four South Africans, Marcus Swanepoel, a former investment banker and Timothy Stranex, a Google software engineer, Carel van Wyk and Pieter Heyns. In 2015 BitX received a $3 million investment injection by the Naspers Group. In September 2020, DCG acquired Luno, a cryptocurrency exchange based in London. At the time of the acquisition, Luno had more than 5 million customers.

=== Yuma ===
In November 2024, DCG announced the launch of Yuma, a decentralized artificial intelligence company aimed at providing capital and technical resources for building applications on the Bittensor blockchain. Barry Silbert was named CEO of Yuma at the time of its launch.

In October 2025, Yuma launched Yuma Asset Management anchored by a $10 million seed investment from DCG, offering institutional and accredited investors structured exposure to subnet tokens within the Bittensor ecosystem.

=== Fortitude Mining ===
In January 2025, DCG spun off Fortitude Mining, the self-mining unit of Foundry, into a new wholly-owned subsidiary focused on self-mining Bitcoin and other digital assets with high long-term growth potential.

== See also ==
- List of bitcoin companies
