= CoinShares International =

European alternative asset manager

CoinShares International Limited
- Company type: Public
- Industry: Financial services
- Founded: 1999; 27 years ago
- Headquarters: Saint Helier, Jersey
- Key people: Jean-Marie Mognetti (CEO)
- Revenue: ▲£126.8 million (2024)
- Net income: ▲£107.5 million (2024)
- Number of employees: ca. 90 (2024)
- Website: www.coinshares.com

CoinShares International Limited is a financial services provider and asset manager based in Jersey that specializes in digital assets (especially cryptocurrencies). The company, headquartered in St. Helier (Jersey), was founded in 2013 / 2014 and is considered one of the first companies in the crypto investment sector. CoinShares offers institutional and private investors access to crypto investments, for example through exchange-traded crypto products (ETPs), funds, and other financial products. The group has been listed on the Stockholm Stock Exchange since 2021, and in September 2025, a secondary listing on the New York Stock Exchange was announced.

== History ==
CoinShares has its roots in the asset management company Global Advisors (Jersey) Limited, which was founded in 1999 and initially specialized in commodity investments. Under the leadership of Daniel Masters, a former JPMorgan trader, and other financial analysts, the company shifted its focus to cryptocurrencies in 2014. In 2014, Global Advisors launched the Global Advisors Bitcoin Investment Fund (GABI), the world's first regulated Bitcoin fund to be publicly traded. In 2016, CoinShares (as the successor to Global Advisors) acquired the Swedish company XBT Provider, which had already launched the world's first exchange-traded Bitcoin security (ETP) on Nasdaq Stockholm in 2015.

In the following years, CoinShares grew through further innovations and partnerships. In 2018, CoinShares teamed up with Japanese bank Nomura and hardware wallet company Ledger to found Komainu, a digital asset custody service focused on institutional clients. In 2020, the company brought in experienced executives from the ETF industry to senior positions to drive growth in crypto-based investment products. In March 2021, CoinShares itself went public: the company's shares were initially listed on the Nasdaq First North Growth Market in Stockholm. CoinShares raised around SEK 151 million in new capital during its IPO; on its first day of trading, its market capitalisation reached almost US$1 billion. In December 2022, the company moved to the main market of the Stockholm Stock Exchange, making CoinShares the first major crypto asset management firm to be listed on a regular stock exchange platform in Europe.

CoinShares experienced strong growth in the mid-2020s. Assets under management rose from around $4 billion at the beginning of 2021 to around $10 billion in 2025. However, the company was also affected by market turbulence: the collapse of the Terra/Luna stablecoin ecosystem in May 2022 and the bankruptcy of the crypto exchange FTX in November 2022 led to significant losses for CoinShares. As a result, the group discontinued its offering for retail investors, including its crypto trading app, in order to refocus on its core business of institutional products.

In 2023, the company established a hedge fund division to offer actively managed crypto investment strategies to US investors for the first time. In March 2024, CoinShares acquired US-based Valkyrie Investments (since then CoinShares Valkyrie), a provider of crypto ETFs, to accelerate its entry into the US market.

In July 2025, the French subsidiary CoinShares Asset Management received a license from the Autorité des Marchés Financiers (AMF) under the new EU Markets in Crypto-Assets (MiCA) regulation. This Europe-wide license allows CoinShares to offer crypto investment products and portfolio management services throughout the EU. CoinShares was previously licensed as a crypto asset manager in various EU countries (including France, Germany, and others) on the basis of national regulations.

In September 2025, CoinShares finally announced that it would be listed on the Nasdaq in New York, through a merger with the US shell company Vine Hill Capital. This SPAC transaction values CoinShares at approximately $1.2 billion and is intended to promote further growth, particularly in the US.

== Activities ==
The business focus is on exchange-traded crypto products (ETPs), which enable investors to invest in cryptocurrencies without having to hold them directly. Through its Swedish subsidiary XBT Provider and its in-house CoinShares Physical product line, CoinShares is Europe's largest issuer of crypto ETPs; at the end of 2023, the company held approximately 45% of the European market share of crypto ETP assets under management. The sell physically backed ETPs on individual cryptocurrencies (such as Bitcoin, Ethereum, Solana, etc.), thematic crypto basket ETPs, and ETPs with income components (e.g., staking ETPs). In addition, CoinShares calculates crypto indices such as the CoinShares Blockchain Global Equity Index (BLOCK), which tracks the stock performance of companies in the blockchain sector.

For professional and institutional clients, CoinShares also sells active investment products. In 2023, the company launched CoinShares Hedge Fund Solutions, which offers various trading strategies on Bitcoin and Ether in the form of alternative investment funds (e.g., arbitrage and option strategies). CoinShares is also involved in capital market activities (market making and liquidity provision for digital assets) and venture investments in crypto start-ups. For example, CoinShares was involved in financing the crypto bank FlowBank (In liquidation June 2024) and the crypto custodian Komainu.
