= Bitcoin.com =

Cryptocurrency services website

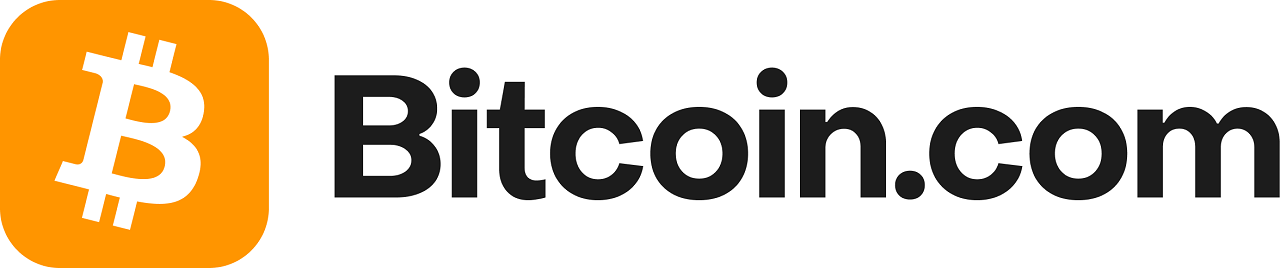
- Website type: Private
- Headquarters: Saint Kitts and Nevis
- Area served: Worldwide
- CEO: Corbin Fraser
- Industry: Cryptocurrency
- Products: Cryptocurrency/web3 wallet, news, exchange, games
- Services: Cryptocurrency sales, trading
- Employees: 125 (January 2022)
- Website: bitcoin.com
- Commercial: Yes
- Current status: Active
- Native clients on: iOS, Android, web

Bitcoin.com is a cryptocurrency services company founded in 2014 by entrepreneur Roger Ver, who acquired the Bitcoin.com domain that year. Headquartered in Saint Kitts and Nevis, the company develops tools for buying, selling, storing, and managing cryptocurrencies, alongside operating a news and education portal focused on blockchain technology.

== Products and services ==
As a cryptocurrency company, Bitcoin.com provides products, services, and information related to the purchasing, selling, storing, and using of cryptocurrencies.

Bitcoin.com's flagship product is the Bitcoin.com Wallet, a platform for buying, selling, trading, holding, using, and managing cryptocurrencies. The Bitcoin.com Wallet was launched in June 2017 as a mobile app.

== History ==
The Bitcoin.com domain name was first registered in 2000 to the Swedish company Hurricane Communication AB. The company let it lapse, and, in 2003, it was picked up by Korean-based IVN Technology, which held the domain until 2005. The domain lay fallow until January 2008, when Jesse Heitler registered the name again. Heitler held on until July 2010, when he got an offer for $2,000. The domain subsequently changed hands a few times with no significant web activity.

Roger Ver, then gained control of the Bitcoin.com domain name in April 2014, where he leased it to Blockchain.info and then later to OKCoin. In May 2015, the 5-year agreement was terminated by OKCoin who issued a statement claiming the agreement regarding the domain was invalid due to the entity named in the documents not being representative of the actual company. Ver sued OKCoin's Hong Kong entity over contract breaches and was awarded a $570,000 judgement by a Hong Kong court in November 2017.

In May 2020, former Apple and Rakuten senior manager Dennis Jarvis was appointed CEO of Bitcoin.com. Jarvis redefined Bitcoin.com's vision to more broadly support the concept of ‘economic freedom’ rather than promote a specific cryptocurrency.

In April 2021, the Bitcoin.com domain was erroneously listed for sale on GoDaddy. This prompted site owner Roger Ver to demand the domain registrar and web hosting company remove the $100 million listing, which it did without providing further explanation.

== See also ==
- List of bitcoin companies
