= Nasdaq Private Market =

American private-market fintech and capital markets company

- Type: Private
- Industry: Financial technology, capital markets
- Founded: 2013; 13 years ago (within Nasdaq, Inc.)
- Headquarters: 3 East 28th Street, New York City, U.S.
- Key people: Tom Callahan (CEO)
- Products: Secondary trading platform, liquidity programs, transfer and settlement, private-market data
- Parent: Nasdaq, Inc. (2013–2021)
- Website: nasdaqprivatemarket.com

Nasdaq Private Market is an American fintech and capital markets company that provides infrastructure for private companies and their investors, spanning pre-IPO investing, liquidity solutions, data and intelligence, and capital market services. The company operates a secondary trading platform for private company stock, serving investors, private companies, and individuals navigating the private markets. Nasdaq Private Market was founded within Nasdaq, Inc. in 2013 and was spun off as an independent company in 2021, backed by a group of institutional investors and Nasdaq. Nasdaq Private Market is headquartered at 3 East 28th Street, New York City.

== History ==
=== 2013–2015: Founding and early growth ===
Nasdaq Private Market was founded within Nasdaq, Inc. in 2013 in response to the Jumpstart Our Business Startups (JOBS) Act, which expanded opportunities for private companies to raise capital and facilitate secondary trading of their shares. The company launched its original marketplace platform for private companies in March 2014. On October 22, 2015, the company acquired SecondMarket Solutions, Inc.

=== 2016–2020: Early transaction milestones ===
Nasdaq Private Market's secondary transaction volume reached $1.6 billion in 2015. The company continued to build transaction volume over the following years, and in October 2018 it marked its 200th secondary transaction.

=== 2021–2023: Spin-off and expansion ===
On July 20, 2021, Nasdaq Private Market spun off from Nasdaq, Inc. to become an independent, standalone company. In the first six months following the spin-off, the company recorded 57 liquidity transactions. By January 2022, cumulative transaction volume had surpassed $40 billion. Tom Callahan was appointed the company's first Chief Executive Officer in April 2022. In January 2023, Nasdaq Private Market acquired VC Experts, a provider of private-company research and data. In April 2023, the company launched its Transfer and Settlement (T&S) product. By September 2023, cumulative executed secondary transaction volume had crossed $45 billion.

=== 2024–present: Scaling and recognition ===
Nasdaq Private Market closed a $62.4 million Series B financing round in February 2024, led by Nasdaq with participation from existing investors Allen & Company, Citi, and Goldman Sachs, and new investment from BNP Paribas, DRW Venture Capital, UBS, and Wells Fargo. In June 2024, the company elected industry veteran Louis Citron as a new independent board member. By September 2024, its Transfer and Settlement product had surpassed $500 million in cumulative bilateral trade volume. The company recorded approximately $15 billion in transaction volume on behalf of clients during 2025. In January 2026, Nasdaq Private Market closed a $37.6 million Series C financing round. On March 10, 2026, the U.S. Patent and Trademark Office granted Nasdaq Private Market a patent for its private-company securities transferring and settlement platform.

== Products and services ==
=== Liquidity solutions ===
Nasdaq Private Market helps private companies design and manage structured liquidity programs, including tender offers, that allow employees, founders, and investors to sell shares while enabling companies to retain control over pricing, participation, and ownership.

=== Investment platform ===
Nasdaq Private Market operates a secondary marketplace that enables accredited investors to purchase pre-IPO shares, while allowing employees and other shareholders to sell private-company stock through a secure platform.

=== Data and intelligence ===
Nasdaq Private Market's data and intelligence platform provides private-market data, including daily pricing, funding history, valuation analysis, ownership insights, and sector benchmarks, allowing investors to evaluate private companies and make informed decisions. The platform also supports private-market pricing and valuation analysis.

=== Settlement ===
Nasdaq Private Market's Settlement platform streamlines the transfer of private-company shares by automating the post-trade process, from approvals and documentation to payment coordination and record updates. As the private market's first patented private-securities settlement platform, it standardizes workflows across issuers and trading venues.

=== Capital solutions ===
Nasdaq Private Market's Capital Solutions team connects private companies, fund managers, and institutional investors by structuring and executing transactions such as tender offers, block trades, primary capital raises, and single-asset funds.

=== WealthConnect ===
WealthConnect helps employees and shareholders manage their equity by connecting them with financial advisors, robo-advisors, high-yield savings accounts, and family-office services, including equity-specific tax and wealth planning support.

== Investors ==
Nasdaq Private Market's institutional investor base includes the following firms.

Investor	Note
Nasdaq	Strategic investor since spin-off; led Series B
Allen & Company	Investment bank
Bank of America	Added to consortium, August 2024
BNP Paribas	Joined via Series B, February 2024
Cerity Partners	Led Series C, January 2026; wealth management partner
Citi	Early institutional investor
DRW Venture Capital	Joined via Series B, February 2024
Goldman Sachs	Early institutional investor
HiJoJo Partners	Added to consortium, August 2024
Morgan Stanley	Early institutional investor
Optiver	Joined via Series C, January 2026; market-making expertise
UBS	Joined via Series B, February 2024
Wells Fargo	Joined via Series B, February 2024

== Leadership ==
Nasdaq Private Market's executive leadership team is as follows.

Name	Title
Tom Callahan	Chief Executive Officer
James Brooks	Chief Strategy Officer
Mike Buono	Managing Director and Co-Head of Private Shares Trading
Rotem David	Chief Product and Technology Officer
Parul Dubey	Head of Asset Management
Griffith Garrabrant	Head of Business Operations & Settlement
Phil Germann	Managing Director and Co-Head of Private Shares Trading
Amanda Gold	Chief of Staff and Chief People Officer
Kevin Gsell	Managing Director and Head of Company Solutions
Andrew Kroculick	Chief Operating Officer
René Paula	Chief Financial Officer and Chief Legal Officer
Chris Setaro	Chief Compliance and Regulatory Officer
Bill Spoor	Head of Capital Solutions
Samantha Tortora	Chief Growth and Chief Marketing Officer

== Technology ==
=== Trading marketplace ===
Nasdaq Private Market operates its secondary marketplace through NPM Securities, LLC, a broker-dealer and FINRA member firm that runs the platform as an SEC-regulated alternative trading system (ATS). The ATS utilizes various price discovery and execution mechanisms. Structured liquidity programs are issuer-controlled events that enable an issuer's shareholders to gain liquidity in an orderly manner while providing the issuer with control over share transfers and securities law compliance; they can take the form of scheduled trading windows, auctions, one-off block secondary transactions, primaries, and subscriptions. Buy-side auctions allow a company to invite a curated set of institutional investors to submit competitive bids to establish a clearing price, and block trades allow a single seller to work with Nasdaq Private Market to source institutional buyers for a large position. For auctions, the platform can run multiple formats, including first-price auctions for investor and founder share blocks, and incorporates a seller indication-of-interest (IOI) process to gauge sell-side demand before a program launches. The technology layer handles participant onboarding, documentation and signature collection, and connects sellers to a network of vetted institutional buyers, while giving companies configurable controls over transaction timing, price collars, and the number of participants in a given program.

=== Transfer and Settlement product ===
Launched in April 2023, the Transfer and Settlement (T&S) product automates the post-trade workflow for private-company share transfers, including issuer consent, document collection, trade matching, and payment processing. According to company reports, the platform settles transactions in approximately one week, compared with historical settlement timelines of 90 to 120 days.

=== PAM ===
PAM is Nasdaq Private Market's AI-powered "private market agent," an assistant integrated into the company's Investment Platform that guides users through discovery, analysis, and transaction phases of buying and selling private company stock. PAM is available as an iOS application.
