= New York State Department of Financial Services =

Responsible for regulating financial services and products

Department of Financial Services
- Seal

- Logo

Department overview
- Formed: October 3, 2011
- Jurisdiction: New York
- Headquarters: New York, N.Y.
- Department executive: Kaitlin Asrow, Superintendent of Financial Services (Acting)
- Key document: Financial Services Law
- Website: dfs.ny.gov

The New York State Department of Financial Services (DFS or NYSDFS) is the department of the New York state government responsible for regulating financial services and products, including those subject to the New York insurance, banking and financial services laws.

== History ==
The original predecessor body to the DFS was established in 1829 and was the first autonomous bank supervisor in the United States. In 1998, the department was given authority over external review agents in the state's health insurance external appeals process.

As part of the 2011 state budget, Governor Andrew M. Cuomo and the New York State Legislature consolidated the New York State Insurance Department and New York State Banking Department and created the New York State Department of Financial Services effective October 3, 2011. The purpose of consolidating the agencies and creating the Department of Financial Services was to modernize regulation by allowing the agency to oversee a broader array of financial products and services, such as service contract providers.

== Supervision ==
The department supervises approximately 4400 entities, with assets of about $6.2 trillion. These entities include: state-chartered banks and trust companies; insurance companies; insurance producers; insurance adjusters; bail bond agents; service contracts; life settlements; budget planners; charitable foundations; check cashers; credit unions; investment companies; licensed lenders; money transmitters; mortgage bankers; mortgage brokers; mortgage loan servicers; premium finance agencies; private bankers; safe deposit companies; sales finance companies; savings banks; and savings and loans.

== Leadership ==
The New York State Legislature unanimously confirmed Benjamin M. Lawsky on May 24, 2011, as New York State's first Superintendent of Financial Services. From May 24, 2011, until October 3, 2011, Lawsky also was appointed, and served as, Acting Superintendent of Banks for the former New York State Banking Department. As Superintendent of Banks, Lawsky led Governor Andrew M. Cuomo’s initiative to consolidate the New York State Banking Department and New York State Insurance Department towards a new financial regulator called the Department of Financial Services.

James J. Wrynn, former Superintendent of Insurance, was appointed as Deputy Superintendent of Financial Services for the Department. He left the Department in March 2012 to become a partner at Goldberg Segalla LLP.

In August 2021, Governor Kathy Hochul appointed Adrienne A. Harris to lead the Department. The New York State Legislature confirmed Harris on January 25, 2022. Prior to joining DFS, Superintendent Harris served as Senior Advisor to Deputy Treasury Secretary, Sarah Bloom Raskin. She then moved to the White House where she managed the financial services portfolio at the National Economic Council for President Obama. After leaving the White House, Superintendent Harris served as General Counsel and Chief Business Officer at Doma and also served as a Professor and Faculty Co-Director at the University of Michigan’s Gerald R. Ford School of Public Policy’s Center on Finance, Law and Policy.

== Organization ==
The Department has five divisions: the insurance division; banking division, consumer protection and financial enforcement division ("CPFED"), research & innovation division, cybersecurity division, and climate division. The insurance division has life, health, and property bureaus. The CPFED was created by the Financial Services Law and aims to protect and educate consumers of financial products and services. It also aims to fight financial fraud. The CPFED pursues civil and criminal investigations of activities that may constitute violations of the Financial Services Law, Banking Law, Insurance Law, or other laws, and brings enforcement proceedings where appropriate.

The department also has an Office of General Counsel, which is the legal arm of the department. It drafts legislation, regulations, and circular letters, issues legal opinions, and renders legal advice to Department staff.

== Offices and locations ==
The department's main office is in New York City at One State Street. The department also has offices at One Commerce Plaza in Albany, 333 East Washington Street in Syracuse, 65 Court Street in Buffalo, and 163B Mineola Boulevard in Mineola.

== Activities ==
The department's regulations are compiled in titles 3, 11, and 23 of the New York Codes, Rules and Regulations (NYCRR).

=== Bitcoin ===
In August 2013, Forbes magazine reported that the department initiated an investigation into bitcoin by issuing subpoenas to several companies and investors.

On July 17, 2014, the department released details on a proposed BitLicense, which places regulations on any company or person that uses cryptocurrencies residing in New York. The proposed regulations were officially published in the New York State Register on July 23, beginning a 45-day comment period. On February 25, 2015, a revised proposal notice was published, beginning another 30-day comment period.

=== Standard Chartered Fined ===
On 19 August 2014, Standard Chartered was fined $300 million by the department for breach of money-laundering compliance related to potentially high-risk transactions involving the bank's clients in Hong Kong and the UAE. The bank issued a statement accepting responsibility and regretting the deficiencies.

=== Deutsche Bank Fined ===
On January 30, 2017, the NYSDFS (New York State Department of Financial Services) fined Deutsche Bank $425 million for violating New York's anti-money laundering laws.

=== Service Contract Providers ===
The DFS has the authority to license and regulate service contract providers. A list of the currently licensed service contractor providers can be found at Currently Registered Service Contract Providers. New York State and other states, such as California, have the authority to fine or prosecute unlicensed service contract providers.
