= Hashrate =

Measure of the speed of blockchain miners

The proof-of-work distributed computing schemes, including Bitcoin, frequently use cryptographic hashes as a proof-of-work algorithm. Hashrate is a measure of the total computational power of all participating nodes expressed in units of hash calculations per second. The hash/second units are small, so usually multiples are used, for large networks the preferred unit is terahash (1 trillion hashes), for example, in 2023 the Bitcoin hashrate was about 300,000,000 terahashes per second (that is 300 exahashes or $3 \cdot {10}^{20}$ hash calculations every second).

== Impact on network security ==
A higher hashrate signifies a stronger and more secure blockchain network. Increased computational power dedicated to mining operations acts as a defense mechanism, making it more challenging for malicious entities to disrupt network operations. It serves as a barrier against potential attacks, particularly the significant concern of a 51% attack.

== Mining difficulty ==
Mining difficulty, intrinsically connected to hashrate, indicates the challenge miners face in producing a hash lower than the target hash. It is purposefully designed to adjust periodically, ensuring a consistent addition of blocks to the blockchain.

== Hashrate and miner participation ==
An increase in the miner count results in higher hashrate. This surge is often driven by the attractiveness of potential returns due to the escalated demand for cryptocurrencies, such as Bitcoin or Ethereum.

== Sources ==
- de Vries, Alex; Gallersdörfer, Ulrich; Klaaßen, Lena; Stoll, Christian (2022). "Revisiting Bitcoin's carbon footprint". Joule. 6 (3): 498–502. doi:10.1016/j.joule.2022.02.005. hdl:1871.1/68298c43-a3fb-4197-8d83-a6159dd2c175.
- King, Juan C.; Dale, Roberto; Amigó, José M. (2024). "Blockchain metrics and indicators in cryptocurrency trading". Chaos, Solitons & Fractals. 178 114305. arXiv:2403.00770. Bibcode:2024CSF...17814305K. doi:10.1016/j.chaos.2023.114305.
