= Grayscale Investments =

American digital asset management company

Grayscale Investments, LLC
- Type: Subsidiary
- Industry: Finance
- Founded: 2013; 13 years ago
- Headquarters: Stamford, Connecticut, United States
- Key people: Peter Mintzberg (CEO)
- Services: Asset management
- AUM: US$50 billion (2021)
- Parent: Digital Currency Group
- Website: grayscale.com

Grayscale Investments, LLC is an American digital currency asset management company and subsidiary of Digital Currency Group founded in 2013 and based in Stamford, Connecticut.

== History ==
Grayscale was founded in 2013, launching a bitcoin trust that year. In 2015, the company became a subsidiary of Digital Currency Group. The same year, Grayscale Bitcoin Trust (OTCQX: GBTC) began trading over-the-counter on the OTCQX market, becoming the first publicly traded bitcoin fund in the United States. The company charged higher than average fees compared to similar exchange-traded funds (ETFs), but said the fees were to cover the costs of trading bitcoin. Grayscale sought to turn GBTC into an ETF in 2017, but voluntarily withdrew the application following negative remarks from the SEC.

In 2017, Grayscale launched two additional cryptocurrency investment funds which held Ethereum Classic and Zcash. The following year, the company launched its fourth cryptocurrency fund, the Digital Large Cap Fund (GDLC), initially holding bitcoin, Ether, Litecoin, Ripple, and Bitcoin Cash. GDLC began trading publicly in October 2019. GBTC became an SEC-reporting bitcoin investment fund in 2020.

In 2021, the company added Grayscale Solana Trust to its portfolio. The company managed digital assets totalling $50 billion. In August 2024, it launched the Grayscale Avalanche Trust, which holds AVAX.

In 2022, Grayscale launched an ETF traded on American, British, Italian, and German exchanges that tracks the Bloomberg Grayscale Future of Finance Index, consisting of asset managers, exchanges, brokerages, and cryptocurrency miners. In June 2022, the SEC denied Grayscale's request to turn GBTC into an exchange-traded fund, citing concerns about the lack of oversight over cryptocurrencies and the risk of price fixing. The denial prompted Grayscale to sue the agency.

For much of GBTC's existence, investors in the trust including Alameda Research engaged in arbitrage trades based on the difference in price between GBTC’s shares and the corresponding amount of bitcoin. At the time of Alameda’s bankruptcy, shares of GBTC were trading at a lower value than the corresponding amount of bitcoin held by the trust. Alameda's post-bankruptcy management sued Grayscale in 2023 to recover the value of the shares in bitcoin.

In 2022, the SEC denied the conversion of Grayscale Bitcoin Trust into an ETF because of alleged lack of surveillance capabilities. Grayscale filed a case against the SEC arguing that the former allowed Bitcoin Futures ETF. Now, both Futures ETF and Spot ETF relied on the same underlying, i.e., Bitcoin. Grayscale while following the same surveillance measures was denied a license. Finally, it won the case by unanimous vote in the United States Court of Appeals for the District of Columbia Circuit on August 29, 2023. Michael Sonnenshein suggested his firm's ETF would survive, along with a few others, but most wouldn't see widespread interest and adoption.

Grayscale launched three new funds in July 2024: a spot Ether ETF, a mini Bitcoin ETF, and an investment fund for artificial intelligence-related cryptocurrency projects. The following month, Peter Mintzberg succeeded Sonnenshein as CEO.

In July 2025, Grayscale filed confidentially for an initial public offering listing. By November 2025, when Grayscale filed publicly for an IPO, its revenue dropped by 20% as compared to the same time last year.
