= Stellar (payment network) =

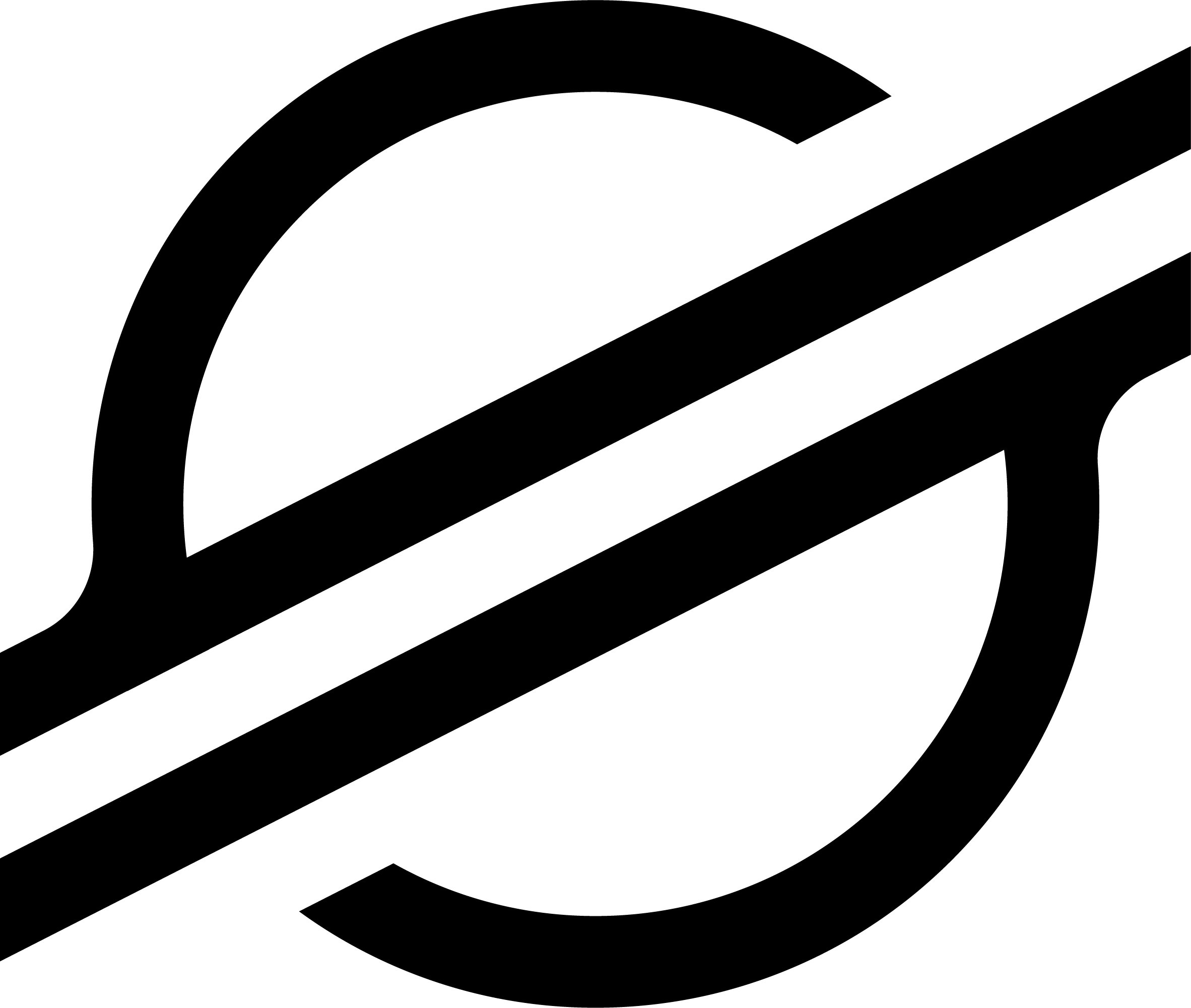
- Original authors: Jed McCaleb; Joyce Kim
- Developer: Stellar Development Foundation
- Release: July 31, 2014; 12 years ago
- Written in: C++, Rust, Go, Java, JavaScript, Python, Ruby
- Operating system: Cross-platform
- Type: Blockchain
- License: Apache License 2.0
- Website: stellar.org
- Repository: github.com/stellar/stellar-core

Lumen
Denominations
- Plural: lumens
- Symbol: *
- Code: XLM
- Precision: 10^{−7}
- Subunits
- 1/10000000: stroop

Development
- White paper: The Stellar Consensus Protocol: A Federated Model for Internet-level Consensus
- Initial release: July 31, 2014; 12 years ago
- Development status: Active

Ledger
- Supply limit: 50 billion

Website
- Website: stellar.org

Stellar, or Stellar Lumens (symbol: XLM), is a cryptocurrency protocol which allows transactions between any pair of currencies.

The Stellar protocol is supported by the nonprofit Stellar Development Foundation (though this organization does not have 501(c)(3) tax-exempt status) which was founded in 2014. The for profit arm, Lightyear.io, was founded in 2017.

== Overview ==
Stellar is an open-source protocol for exchanging money or tokens using the Stellar Consensus Protocol. The platform's source code is hosted on GitHub.

Servers run a software implementation of the protocol, and use the Internet to connect to and communicate with other Stellar servers. Each server stores a ledger of all the accounts in the network. 3 nodes are operated by the Stellar Development Foundation, in conjunction with 22 other organizations, providing for a total of 77 validator nodes. Transactions among accounts occur not through mining but rather through a consensus process among accounts in a quorum slice. Cryptoasset would like to use a Nodes asset as validator

== History ==
In 2014, Jed McCaleb, founder of Mt. Gox and co-founder of Ripple, launched the network system Stellar with former lawyer Joyce Kim. Before the official launch, McCaleb formed a website called "Secret Bitcoin Project" seeking alpha testers. The nonprofit Stellar Development Foundation was created in collaboration with Stripe CEO Patrick Collison and the project officially launched that July. Stellar received $3 million in seed funding from Stripe. Stellar was released as a decentralized payment network and protocol with a native currency, stellar. At its launch, the network had 100 billion stellars. 25 percent of those would be given to other non-profits working toward financial inclusion. Stripe received 2 percent or 2 billion of the initial stellar in return for its seed investment. The cryptocurrency, originally known as stellar, was later called Lumens or XLM. In August 2014, Mercado Bitcoin, the first Brazilian bitcoin exchange, announced it would be using the Stellar network. By January 2015, Stellar had approximately 3 million registered user accounts on its platform and its market cap was almost $15 million.

The Stellar Development Foundation released an upgraded protocol with a new consensus algorithm in April 2015 which went live in November 2015. The new algorithm used SCP, a cryptocurrency protocol created by Stanford professor David Mazières.

Lightyear.io, a for-profit entity of Stellar, was launched in May 2017 as the commercial arm of the company. In September 2017, Stellar announced a benefits program, part of its Stellar Partnership Grant Program, which would award partners up to $2 million worth of Lumens for project development. In September 2018, Lightyear Corporation acquired Chain, Inc and the combined company was named Interstellar.

In 2021, Franklin Templeton launched the first tokenised US mutual fund using Stellar.

== Usage ==
In 2015, it was announced that Stellar was releasing an integration into Vumi, the open-sourced messaging platform of the Praekelt Foundation in South Africa. Vumi uses cellphone talk time as currency using the Stellar protocol. Stellar partnered with cloud-based banking software company Oradian in April 2015 to integrate Stellar into Oradian's banking platform to add microfinance institutions (MFIs) in Nigeria.

In December 2016, it was announced that Stellar's payment network had expanded to include Coins.ph, a mobile payments startup in the Philippines, ICICI Bank in India, African mobile payments firm Flutterwave, and French remittances company Tempo Money Transfer.

In October 2017, Stellar partnered with IBM and KlickEx to facilitate cross-border transactions in the South Pacific region. The cross-border payment system developed by IBM includes partnerships with banks in the area. The Lumens digital currency was ranked 13th in market capitalization at the time of the IBM partnership.

In December 2017, TechCrunch announced Stellar's partnership with SureRemit, a Nigerian-based remittances platform.

== See also ==
- Remittance
- LBC Express
- Bank of America
- Palawan Express
