= Distributed ledger =

Data synchronised across multiple sites

A distributed ledger (also called a shared ledger or distributed ledger technology or DLT) is a system whereby replicated, shared, and synchronized digital data is geographically spread (distributed) across many sites, countries, or institutions. In contrast to a centralized database, a distributed ledger does not require a central administrator, and consequently does not have a single (central) point-of-failure.. This distributed nature creates distinct trade-offs in terms of its affordances and constraints, particularly in interorganizational settings.

In general, a distributed ledger requires a peer-to-peer (P2P) computer network and consensus algorithms so that the ledger is reliably replicated across distributed computer nodes (servers, clients, etc.). The most common form of distributed ledger technology is the blockchain (commonly associated with cryptocurrency), which can either be on a public or private network. Infrastructure for data management is a common barrier to implementing DLT..

== Characteristics ==
Distributed ledger data is typically spread across multiple nodes (computational devices) on a P2P network, where each replicates and saves an identical copy of the ledger data and updates itself independently of other nodes. The primary advantage of this distributed processing pattern is the lack of a central authority, which would constitute a single point of failure. When a ledger update transaction is broadcast to the P2P network, each distributed node processes a new update transaction independently, and then collectively all working nodes use a consensus algorithm to determine the correct copy of the updated ledger. Once a consensus has been determined, all the other nodes update themselves with the latest, correct copy of the updated ledger. Security is enforced through cryptographic keys and signatures.

== Applications ==
Certificate Transparency is an Internet security standard for monitoring and auditing the issuance of digital certificates based on a distributed ledger. It was initiated in 2011, standardised in 2013 and started to be used by the Google Chrome browser for all certificates in 2018.

In 2016, some banks tested distributed ledger systems for payments to determine their usefulness. In 2020, Axoni launched Veris, a distributed ledger platform that manages equity swap transactions. The platform, which matches and reconciles post-trade data on stock swaps, is used by BlackRock Inc., Goldman Sachs Group Inc., and Citigroup, Inc.

A pilot scheme by the Monetary Authority of Singapore completed its first live trades using DLT in 2022. The pilot by Singapore's central bank involved JP Morgan, SBI Digital Asset Holdings and DBS. The banks traded using smart contracts against liquidity pools of tokenized Singapore government bonds, Japanese government bonds, yen, and Singapore dollars. Singapore has set up two more pilots. Standard Chartered Bank is exploring tokens for trade finance; and HSBC and United Overseas Bank are working with Marketnode, a digital markets infrastructure provider, on products for wealth management.

DLT can be used for smart contracting, which is the formation of contracts which automatically complete when triggered by prevailing conditions.

DLT is itself secured by cryptographic methods, but can also be used as a base layer on which to build further cryptographic applications, such as protocols that require or benefit from a public broadcast mechanism, including transparent decryption.

== Types ==
In the context of cryptocurrencies, distributed ledger technologies can be categorized in terms of their data structures, consensus algorithms, permissions, and whether they are mined. DLT data structure types include linear data structures (blockchains) to more complex directed acyclic graph (DAG) and hybrid data structures. DLT consensus algorithm types include proof-of-work (PoW) and proof-of-stake (PoS) algorithms and DAG consensus-building and voting algorithms. DLTs are generally either permissioned (private) or permissionless (public). PoW cryptocurrencies are generally either 'mined' or 'non-mined', where the latter typically indicates 'pre-mined' cryptocurrencies, such as XRP or IOTA. PoS cryptocurrencies do not use miners, instead usually relying on validation among owners of the cryptocurrency, such as Cardano or Solana.

Blockchains are the most common DLT type, with a 256-bit secure hash algorithm (SHA). DLTs based on DAG data structures or hybrid blockchain-DAG decrease transaction data size and transaction costs, while increasing transaction speeds compared with bitcoin, the first cryptocurrency. Examples of DAG DLT cryptocurrencies include MIOTA (IOTA Tangle DLT) and HBAR (Hedera Hashgraph). Holochain represents a departure from traditional DLT models, using an agent-centric approach with individual source chains and a distributed hash table (DHT) for data validation, eliminating the need for a global consensus mechanism.

== See also ==
- Hyperledger
- Decentralized Finance (DeFi)
- Cryptoeconomics
- Eventual consistency
- Web3
