= Blockscale =

Brand of crypto-mining ASIC

Intel Blockscale was a brand of crypto-mining accelerator ASIC sold by the U.S. chip manufacturer Intel. The Blockscale product debuted in June 2022, and was cancelled by Intel in April 2023. Intel has stated that it will continue to supply chips to existing customers until April 2024.

The Blockscale chips were SHA-256 hardware accelerators designed for proof-of-work calculations. According to Intel, they were capable of up to 580 GH/s with a power consumption of up to 22.7 W, and a claimed efficiency of up to 26 J/TH. The product came in three variants: the Blockscale 1120, 1140, and 1160.
