= Nano (cryptocurrency) =

Denominations
- Code: XNO (Note: Compatible with ISO 4217, though is not approved) (formerly NANO, XRB)
- Previous names: RaiBlocks
- Precision: 10^{−30} (raw)

Development
- Original author: Colin LeMahieu
- White paper: "Nano – Digital money for the modern world"
- Initial release: 4 October 2015 (11 years ago)
- Latest release: V28.2 / 15 September 2025 (13 months ago)
- Code repository: github.com/nanocurrency
- Development status: Active
- Written in: C++
- Operating system: Linux, MacOS, Windows
- Developer: Nano Foundation
- License: FreeBSD

Ledger
- Timestamping scheme: "Open Representative Voting", a form of proof-of-stake
- Hash function: Blake2
- Issuance schedule: Captcha faucet (ended 20 October 2017; 8 years ago)
- Supply limit: 133,248,297

Website
- Website: nano.org

Nano (Abbreviation: XNO) is a cryptocurrency characterized by a directed acyclic graph data structure and distributed ledger, making it possible for Nano to work without intermediaries. To agree on what transactions to commit (i.e., achieving consensus), it uses a voting system with weight based on the amount of currency an account holds.

Nano was launched in October 2015 by Colin LeMahieu to address the Bitcoin scalability problem and was created to reduce confirmation times and fees. The currency implements no-fee transactions and achieves confirmation in under one second.

== History ==
Colin LeMahieu started the development of Nano in 2014 under the name "RaiBlocks". A year later, RaiBlocks was distributed for free through a captcha-secured faucet. In 2017, after 126,248,289 RaiBlocks were distributed, the faucet shut down. This fixed the total supply to 133,248,297 RaiBlocks, after addition of a 7,000,000 RaiBlocks developer fund. RaiBlocks was rebranded as Nano in 2018. With the distribution phase complete, acquiring the token shifted entirely to secondary markets, circulating via spot exchanges and non-custodial swap services.

=== BitGrail hack ===
On February 9, 2018, the Italian cryptocurrency exchange BitGrail announced its hack and eventual shutdown. Users were prevented from accessing assets stored on the platform, which was collectively worth 17 million Nano, about $170 million at the time. In January 2019 the bankruptcy division of the Court of Florence declared BitGrail bankrupt and held its owner Francesco Firano, not the Nano developers, responsible for the losses. A technical report written for the court found that, after a single withdrawal request from a user, BitGrail's own software had sent the Nano node several requests, and the node had no way to recognise them as duplicates. About $1 million of Firano's personal assets were seized. In December 2020 the Italian postal police accused BitGrail's former head of computer fraud, fraudulent bankruptcy and money laundering.

== Design ==
Nano uses a block-lattice data structure, where every account has its own blockchain for storing transactions. It is the first cryptocurrency to use a directed acyclic graph data structure, by having a "block" consisting of only one transaction and the account's current balance.

Nano's consensus algorithm is similar to proof of stake. In this system, the voting weight is distributed to accounts based on the amount of Nano they hold; accounts then freely delegate this weight to a peer (node) of their choice.

If two contradictory transactions are broadcast to the network, indicating a double-spend attempt, nodes will vote for both transactions and broadcast their vote to the other nodes. The first transaction to reach 67% of the total voting weight is confirmed, while the other is considered invalid.
