= Mirror Trading International =

South African Cryptocurrency Ponzu Scheme

- Type: Private
- Industry: Ponzi scheme, cryptocurrency
- Founder: Johann Steynberg
- Headquarters: South Africa
- Area served: Worldwide
- Website: mirrortradinginternational.com

Mirror Trading International (MTI), declared a pyramid scheme by the South African High Court, was a cryptocurrency trading platform promising automated trading services with significant returns.

MTI was masterminded by Johann Steynberg, who claimed to use an artificial intelligence bot for its trading activities. MTI faced intense scrutiny and legal challenges, particularly from South African authorities, who alleged that it was operating as a fraudulent scheme.

MTI's unraveling led to its eventual collapse, the arrest of key figures, and significant financial losses for many investors.

The scheme involved 100,000 people from 140 countries. Following its collapse in December 2020, liquidators recovered 1,281 BTC and are collaborating with international law enforcement agencies, including the US Federal Bureau of Investigation.

== Timeline ==
Timeline of Mirror Trading International:

2019: MTI was launched in South Africa as an automated bitcoin trading platform, offering significant returns to investors through a trading bot.

2020: Membership in MTI experienced a significant increase, especially due to its network marketing model. In September 2020, vulnerabilities in MTI's website were exposed by Anonymous ZA. In December 2020, MTI collapsed following the disappearance of CEO Johann Steynberg in Brazil

2021: In June 2021, MTI was placed into final liquidation by the Western Cape High Court In December 2021, Johann Steynberg was arrested in Brazil on charges of using forged identity documents

2023: In April 2023, the Western Cape High Court declared MTI a pyramid and Ponzi-type scheme. Attempts to appeal the ruling by Clynton Marks were not granted. MTI's liquidators received recognition in various countries, aiding the investigation and fund recovery efforts.

The liquidators of MTI played a crucial role in the investigation and fund recovery efforts of the Ponzi scheme. Here are some ways in which they aided in these efforts:

Recovery of Funds: The liquidators successfully recovered 1,281 BTC (worth approximately R1.05 billion) from the sale of BTC held by Belize-based broker FXChoice. This recovery was a significant step towards compensating the victims of the scam.

Identification of Possible Debtors: The liquidators conducted preliminary investigations and identified "possible debtors" with claims totaling R2.07 billion. This process involved examining the assets and affairs of individuals and entities associated with MTI, including JNX Online, a company controlled by former MTI CEO Johann Steynberg and his wife Nerina.

Investigation of Assets and Affairs: The liquidators are actively investigating the assets and affairs of JNX Online, which was used by Steynberg to buy and sell BTC and to pay creditors and employees of MTI. This investigation aims to uncover any potential fraudulent activities or hidden assets that could be used to compensate the victims.

Collaboration with International Law Enforcement Agencies: The liquidators have teamed up with international law enforcement agencies, including the US Federal Bureau of Investigation, to assist in the recovery of funds. This collaboration enhances the chances of locating and retrieving assets that may have been moved or hidden outside of South Africa.

Appointment of Crypto Specialists: To aid in the quantification and identification of claims, the liquidators have appointed crypto specialists to analyze the information obtained from MTI's back-office platform, Maxtra Technologies. These specialists possess the expertise needed to navigate the complexities of cryptocurrency transactions and trace funds.

== See also ==
- List of Ponzi schemes
