= Executive Order 14067 =

Executive order signed by U.S. President Joe Biden

- "Ensuring Responsible Development of Digital Assets"
- Type: Executive order
- Number: 14067
- President: Joe Biden
- Signed: March 9, 2022

Federal Register details
- Federal Register document number: 2022-05471
- Publication date: March 14, 2022
- Document citation: 87 FR 14143

Summary
- Guaranteeing that digital assets are developed in a responsible manner.

Repealed by
- Executive Order 14178, "Strengthening American Leadership in Digital Financial Technology", January 23, 2025

Executive Order 14067, officially titled Ensuring Responsible Development of Digital Assets, was signed on March 9, 2022, and is the 83rd executive order signed by U.S. President Joe Biden. The ultimate aim of the order is to develop digital assets in a responsible manner. The executive order addresses the potential national security implications of cryptocurrencies.

== Provisions ==
The executive order aims at developing a digital assets policy plan and organize federal regulators' efforts in this area. The order outlines five main goals, which includes protection of consumers and investors, monetary stability, decreasing financial and national security risks, economic competitiveness, and responsible innovation. It also asks for more work to be done into developing a United States Central Bank Digital Currency (CBDC).

Companies in the digital asset field will likely see policy changes in the form of regulation and enforcement, but it might also give the market and its participants more clarity. The order instructs federal agencies to conduct a wide assessment of existing policies relating to digital assets and to submit reports recommending regulatory and legislative reforms.

The order does not change the way digital assets are governed immediately; nevertheless, it marks the start of a process to develop a regulatory framework that addresses all elements of digital assets. It demonstrates the United States' acknowledgment of the importance of digital assets and blockchain technology in the global financial system, as well as its intention to remain a leader in the global financial system through responsible payment innovation and digital asset development.

== See also ==
- List of executive actions by Joe Biden
