= Axoni =

American technology company

- Company type: Technology company
- Industry: Financial services
- Headquarters: New York City
- Key people: Greg Schvey, CEO
- Website: axoni.com

Axoni is an American technology company that develops blockchain software for financial institutions. It caters to trading firms, infrastructure providers, and technology companies in the United States, Europe, and Asia. The company operates Veris, a distributed ledger system used by large financial companies.

== History ==
Axoni was established in 2013 to build and deploy institutional blockchain and distributed ledger technology similar to the one that powers bitcoin.

This system was developed with other tech companies, namely, R3 and IBM. The permissioned distributed ledger network for derivatives is governed by DTCC and also uses Axcore.

Axoni is also a partner of Options Clearing Corporation (OCC), one of the largest equity derivatives clearing organization. This platform assists BATS, Cboe, Nasdaq, and the NYSE.

=== Veris ===
In 2020, Axoni launched Veris, a distributed ledger network that manages equity swap transactions. This system is designed for matching and reconciling post-trade data on stock swaps. Companies using this network includes BlackRock Inc., Goldman Sachs Group Inc., and Citigroup, Inc. The infrastructure functions as an equity swaps platform, where participating institutions can maintain continual reconciliation of equity swaps until they reach maturity.

Trading is synchronized for a transaction throughout its lifecycle, and participants can relay changes in real-time. Its first recorded swap involved transactions by Citi and Goldman Sachs. It is also based on the Axcore technology, adding to a suite of enterprise software that provides data management, automation, and development kits (e.g., for distributed application).
