= Jed McCaleb =

American cryptocurrency entrepreneur

- Born: June 8, 1975 (age 51); Fayetteville, Arkansas, U.S
- Education: University of California, Berkeley
- Occupation: Software developer
- Known for: eDonkey, Mt. Gox, Ripple, Stellar
- Title: CTO of Stellar
- Website: jedmccaleb.com

Jed McCaleb is an American programmer, entrepreneur, and philanthropist. He is the founder, chairman and ex-CEO of aerospace startup Vast and a co-founder and the CTO of Stellar. Prior to co-founding Stellar, McCaleb founded and served as the CTO of the company Ripple until 2013. McCaleb is also known for creating the Mt. Gox bitcoin exchange, and the peer-to-peer eDonkey and Overnet networks as well as the eDonkey2000 application.

As of May 2026, McCaleb is worth US$3.9 billion according to Forbes' Billionaires List.

== Early life and education ==
McCaleb was born in Fayetteville, Arkansas, and attended the University of California, Berkeley. McCaleb left the University of California, Berkeley without completing his degree, later stating in interviews that he prioritized hands-on projects over formal education. His time there exposed him to early discussions about cryptography and peer-to-peer networks. He eventually dropped out and moved to New York City.

== Career ==
In 2000, McCaleb founded MetaMachine Inc. and released his eDonkey2000 application. Sam Yagan joined him in 2001 and served as CEO of the company. McCaleb served as the CTO of the company and continued to develop the peer-to-peer eDonkey network as well as the Overnet network and the eDonkey2000 application. At its height, the network grew to have over 4 million active users at any given time. In September 2006, the company reached a settlement with the RIAA and agreed that the company and its top executives would "immediately cease distributing eDonkey, eDonkey2000, Overnet and other software versions" and the company would pay $30 million to the RIAA to avoid copyright infringement lawsuits.

In 2007, he purchased the domain Mtgox.com with the intent to create a trading site for Magic: The Gathering cards. After moving on from his original idea, McCaleb repurposed the site in late 2010 as a bitcoin exchange that could process bitcoin-to-dollar trades. The website grew in popularity within months. McCaleb sold the company to Mark Karpelès in February 2011 and remained a minority owner in the company until its collapse in 2014.

In 2011, McCaleb began developing a digital currency in which transactions were verified by consensus among network members which became known as the Ripple protocol, which differs from the mining technique used in bitcoin. He recruited David Schwartz and secured an investment from Jesse Powell before adding Arthur Britto as the chief strategist. McCaleb recruited Chris Larsen to be CEO of the new company, which became known as Opencoin. He continued development of the Ripple protocol and its currency while securing investments before McCaleb left his active role with the company in July 2013.

In 2014, he co-founded the non-profit organization the Stellar Development Foundation with Joyce Kim to develop the Stellar open source protocol to allow cross-border monetary transactions including fiat and digital currencies. The organization debuted on July 31, 2014, and received a $3 million loan from the technology company Stripe. The organization originally based its payment network on the Ripple protocol McCaleb previously developed, but in 2015 adopted the Stellar Consensus Protocol. McCaleb serves as chief technology officer of Stellar.

In May 2017, McCaleb also launched Lightyear.io, a commercial endeavor building on the Stellar network. Before its acquisition, Lightyear facilitated Stellar becoming a global payment and currency exchange initially directed at the developing world. In October 2017, Lightyear partnered with IBM to launch blockchain banking in the South Pacific using Stellar's lumen currency. In September 2018, McCaleb negotiated the merger of Lightyear and Chain.com, creating the new merged entity named InterStellar.

The New York Times named McCaleb one of the top 10 people leading the "blockchain revolution" in 2018.

In 2021, McCaleb founded aerospace company Vast. Vast's announced mission is to develop artificial gravity space stations. As of 2023, McCaleb was Vast's CEO, chairman and sole funder.

== Philanthropy ==
McCaleb donated US$500,000 worth of XRP (at the time of donation) to the Machine Intelligence Research Institute (MIRI), and remains one of its largest donors, as well as joining its advisory board. In February 2018, McCaleb was announced as a new donor to the artificial intelligence research group OpenAI.
