= Mark Karpelès =

Former CEO of Mt. Gox (born 1985)

- Born: Mark Robert Karpelès; June 1, 1985 (age 41); Chenôve, France
- Occupation: Entrepreneur
- Known for: Former CEO of Mt. Gox

Mark Robert Karpelès (born 1 June, 1985) is a French businessman and the former CEO of the bitcoin exchange Mt. Gox. While Mt. Gox became the world's largest bitcoin exchange at its peak under his management, the company filed for bankruptcy in 2014, and Karpelès was subsequently arrested and convicted of data manipulation related to his role there.

== Early life and education ==
Born in 1985 in Chenôve, France, Karpelès is the child of geologist Anne-Robert Karpelès. He was raised in Dijon. From 1995 to 2000, he attended Collège Prieuré de Binson in Châtillon-sur-Marne, near Dormans. He then spent one year at Lycée Claude Bernard in Paris before completing his education in 2003 at Lycée Louis Armand in Paris.

== Career ==
Karpelès moved to Japan in 2009 and founded Tibanne Co. Ltd., a Japan-based bitcoin related technology provider, where he was CEO. In 2011, Karpelès acquired the Mt. Gox bitcoin exchange site from programmer Jed McCaleb, with its original owner receiving 12% of the shares of the new company. He became a founding member of the Bitcoin Foundation, which was created in 2012 to standardize and promote bitcoin, and was on its board until February 2014.

At Mt. Gox, the platform grew under his management and handled the majority of global Bitcoin transactions by 2014. Despite its growth, Mt. Gox faced growing operational, security, and financial challenges, including having $5 million seized from its accounts by the U.S. Department of Homeland Security in 2013 for allegedly lying on bank documents. Mt. Gox then experienced a theft of a significant amount of Bitcoin in 2014. Mt. Gox subsequently filed for bankruptcy, and Karpelès was arrested that year and eventually convicted of data manipulation and falsification of records at Mt. Gox. The collapse of Mt. Gox, and Karpelès's role in it, led Japan to create the first formal regulations for cryptocurrency exchanges and virtual currencies.

After the collapse of Mt. Gox, Karpelès joined London Trust Media, the company behind Freenode and Private Internet Access, as its CTO in April 2018. In 2023, Karpelès was given the title of Duke and became the Minister of Technology for the Joseon Cybernation.

== Arrests and convictions ==
In 2010, at the age of 25, Karpelès was found guilty of fraud during a trial in absentia in France related to his actions on a private server, and he was sentenced to one year in jail. Karpelès had previously been arrested twice in France for charges related to computer fraud, and was convicted and received a suspended sentence of three months as a result of one of the arrests.

In April 2014, after Mt. Gox had filed for bankruptcy, Karpelès was subpoenaed by the United States Department of the Treasury's Financial Crimes Enforcement Network (FinCEN) to testify in Washington, D.C. He responded through his lawyers that he would not be attending the deposition.

On 1 August 2015, Karpelès was arrested by Japanese authorities on suspicion of accessing the Mt. Gox computer system to manipulate account balances. Tokyo prosecutors indicted Karpelès on a series of charges, including embezzlement and aggravated breach of trust, and called for a 10-year prison sentence. Karpelès pleaded not guilty to the charges. On 14 March 2019, the Tokyo District Court found Karpelès guilty of one count of data manipulation for falsifying data to inflate Mt. Gox's holdings by $33.5 million and not guilty of all other charges. He was sentenced to 30 months in prison, suspended for four years, which meant he would serve no time in prison unless he committed additional offenses over the next four years. The court said Karpelès had inflicted "massive harm to the trust of his users" and there was "no excuse" for him to "abuse his status and authority to perform clever criminal acts". Karpelès issued a statement saying he was "happy to be judged not guilty" on the more serious charges and was discussing how to proceed with his lawyers regarding his conviction on the falsifying data charge. His appeal was rejected by the Tokyo High Court in 2020.

During the 2015 trial of Ross William Ulbricht for operating the Silk Road marketplace, his defense argued that Karpelès, rather than Ulbricht, was the individual behind the pseudonym "Dread Pirate Roberts". Homeland Security Investigations agent Jared Der-Yeghiayan had also suspected Karpelès during a 2012–2013 investigation. Karpelès denied any involvement, and Ulbricht was ultimately convicted.
