= XRP Ledger =

Cryptocurrency platform

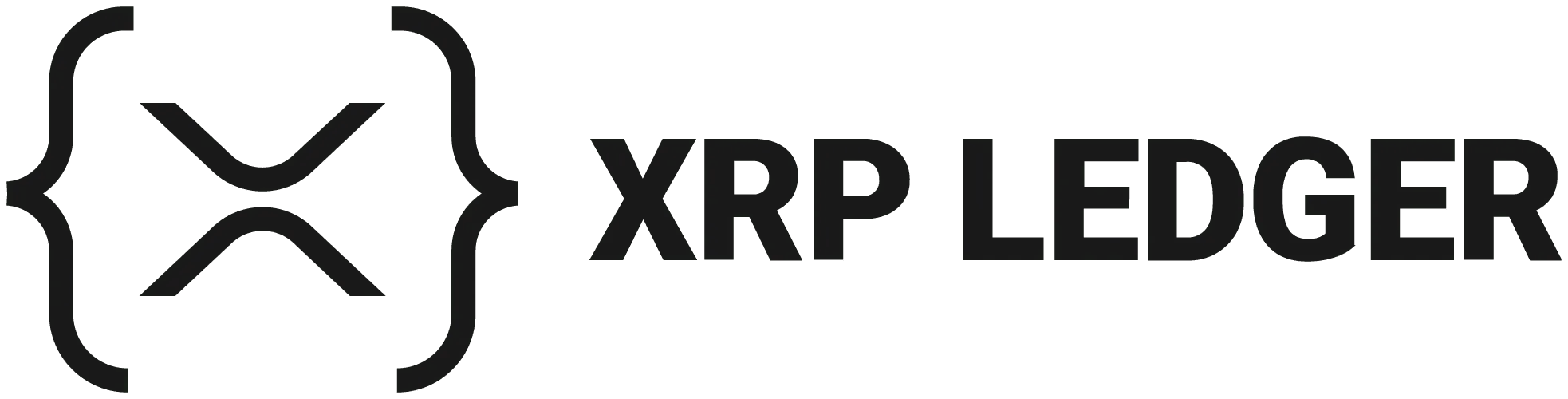
- Other names: XRPL
- Original authors: Jed McCaleb, Arthur Britto, David Schwartz
- Release: June 2012
- Stable release: 2.3.0 / 2 November 2024
- Written in: C++
- Operating system: Server: Linux (RHEL, CentOS, Ubuntu), Windows, macOS (development only)
- Type: Real-time gross settlement, currency exchange, remittance
- License: ISC license
- Website: xrpl.org
- Repository: github.com/XRPLF/rippled

The XRP Ledger (XRPL), also called the Ripple Protocol, is a cryptocurrency platform launched in 2012 by Ripple Labs. The XRPL employs the native cryptocurrency known as XRP, and supports tokens, cryptocurrency or other units of value such as frequent flyer miles or mobile minutes.

== History ==
Development of the XRP Ledger began in 2011 by engineers David Schwartz, Jed McCaleb and Arthur Britto, with a discussion initiated by McCaleb on a public discussion board. The thread was titled "Bitcoin without mining" and was on BitcoinTalk.org. The open-source project was originally called "Ripple", the unique consensus ledger was called the Ripple Consensus Ledger, the transaction protocol was called the Ripple Transaction Protocol or RTXP and the digital asset (known as "ripples") using XRP as the three-letter currency code to follow the naming convention of BTC for Bitcoin. The technology of the "XRP Ledger Consensus Protocol" was formally established in 2012. In May 2018, Ashton Kutcher gifted a charity sponsored by Ellen DeGeneres $4 million in the currency, which was noted at the time to be the "third most-valuable cryptocurrency on the market".

On July 13, 2023, Judge Analisa Torres of the United States District Court for the Southern District of New York issued a decision on motions for summary judgment and stated the XRP token itself is not a security, although the manner in which it is sold could constitute the sale of a security. "XRP, as a digital token, is not in and of itself a 'contract, transaction, or scheme' that embodies the Howey requirements of an investment contract".

On March 2, 2025, President Donald Trump announced that XRP was one of five digital assets that he intended to name to a planned U.S. crypto strategic reserve. On March 6, 2025, the White House officially published the order online.

== Technical overview ==
The XRP Ledger operates on a consensus protocol that differs from traditional proof-of-work (PoW) and proof-of-stake (PoS) mechanisms. Transactions are validated by a network of independent validators who reach consensus every 3 to 5 seconds, enabling rapid transaction settlement. Users rely on a trusted list of validators known as the Unique Node List (UNL). While this approach provides faster transaction validation and security, it has led to discussions about centralization within the network.

The XRP Ledger peer-to-peer overlay network is characterized by a small-world network topology, featuring a tightly clustered structure and short paths between nodes. Information systems expert Mary Lacity notes that this platform "uses much less electricity than Bitcoin—about as much electricity as it costs to run an email server".

== Role of Ripple Labs ==
As Yale economist Gary Gorton notes, "Ripple and XRPL are not the same entity". Shortly after the XRPL was launched, McCaleb, Britto and Chris Larsen founded the company Open Coin in September 2012 to operate on the ledger. On September 26, 2013, OpenCoin officially changed its name to Ripple Labs, Inc and was at the time headed by Chris Larsen. Unlike many cryptocurrencies, XRP was pre-mined, with 100 billion tokens created at inception. The XRPL founders gifted 80 billion XRP, the platform's native currency, to Ripple Labs. Ripple Labs holds a portion of XRP and periodically releases tokens into circulation through sales, aiming to maintain market stability.

== See also ==
- List of online payment service providers
- List of cryptocurrencies
- Remittance
