= Executive Order 14178 =

2025 executive order signed by Trump

- "Strengthening American Leadership in Digital Financial Technology"
- Type: Executive order
- Number: 14178
- President: Donald Trump
- Signed: January 23, 2025

Federal Register details
- Federal Register document number: 2025-02123
- Publication date: January 23, 2025

Summary
- Revokes Executive Order 14067, prohibits the establishment, issuance or promotion of central bank digital currency and establishes a group tasked with proposing a federal regulatory framework for digital assets within 180 days.

Executive Order 14178, titled "Strengthening American Leadership in Digital Financial Technology", is an executive order signed by Donald Trump, the 47th President of the United States, on January 23, 2025 that revokes Executive Order 14067 of 9 March 2022 and the Department of the Treasury's Framework for International Engagement on Digital Assets of 7 July 2022. In addition the order prohibits the establishment, issuance or promotion of central bank digital currency and establishes a group tasked with proposing a federal regulatory framework for digital assets within 180 days.

== See also ==
- Crypto Strategic Reserve
- List of executive orders in the first presidency of Donald Trump
- List of executive actions by Joe Biden
- List of executive orders in the second presidency of Donald Trump
