= Dwolla =

American e-commerce company

Dwolla, Inc
- Company type: Private
- Website type: Online payment system
- Headquarters: Des Moines, Iowa, United States
- Founders: Ben Milne (CEO); Shane Neuerburg (CTO)
- Employees: 75 (2015)
- Website: www.dwolla.com
- Registration: Required (can be done through API)
- Users: 500,000 (Fall 2013)
- Launched: December 1, 2010
- Current status: Active

Dwolla /dəˈwɑːlə/ is a United States-only fintech company that provides businesses with a connection to the ACH Network or RTP Network (Clearing House’s privately owned real-time payments network).

== History ==
The company was founded in 2008 in Iowa by Ben Milne and Shane Neuerburg. After raising $1.31 million in funding, Dwolla launched in the United States in December 2010 to a few small banks and retailers.

By June 2011, Dwolla had grown to 15 employees, 20,000 users, and $1 million in weekly processing volume.

Dwolla has about 650 clients and about 30 million users. It processed about $45 billion in payments in 2022, up from $30 billion in 2021 and $20 billion in 2019. About 80% of its clients are small businesses.

Dwolla provides a white label service consisting of APIs to use the ACH system and white label services expanded from payouts to include instant bank authorization for debiting bank accounts

=== FiSync ===
On May 25, 2011, Dwolla released its FiSync integration, which aims to allow instantaneous transactions instead of the typical 2–3 day of the ACH Network transactions. As of June 2011, Dwolla had 11 financial institutions signed on, providing access to 600,000 potential customers. Dwolla quietly discontinued FiSync on January 31, 2017.

=== Government payments ===
As of April 2013, the Iowa Department of Revenue allows businesses that pay cigarette stamp taxes to use Dwolla as a method of payment. Iowa Governor Terry Branstad announced on January 6, 2014 that the state will expand the partnership to allow customers of Iowa Department of Transportation to pay fuel tax and vehicle registration costs online using the service.

In February 2015, the US Treasury Department's Bureau of Fiscal Service added Dwolla to the system which allows US Federal agencies to issue and receive electronic payments.

=== Inadequate security practices ===
On February 27, 2016, the Consumer Financial Protection Bureau (CFPB) released its first data security-related enforcement action against Dwolla, Inc. Relying on its UDAAP-related authority, the CFPB alleged that Dwolla failed to maintain adequate data security practices despite representations made on the company website and in communications with consumers that the company has implemented practices that exceed industry standards. Among other requirements, Dwolla has agreed to settle and must cease making any misrepresentations about its data security practices.

=== The Dwolla Platform ===
In 2016, Dwolla became a B2B SaaS company, selling its payment software directly to businesses so they can offer their customers bank transfers as a payment option in addition to credit cards. Since 2016, the Dwolla Platform has added new features along with real-time payments, push-to-debit payments and Same Day ACH credits or debits.

== See also ==
- List of online payment service providers
