= List of cryptocurrencies =

Since the creation of bitcoin in 2009, the number of new cryptocurrencies has expanded rapidly.

The UK's Financial Conduct Authority estimated there were over 20,000 different crypto tokens by the start of 2023, although many of these were no longer traded and would never grow to a significant size.

Active and inactive currencies are listed in this article.

== Active currencies by date of introduction ==
Year of introduction	Currency	Symbol	Founder(s)	Hash algorithm	Programming language of implementation	Consensus mechanism	Notes
2009	Bitcoin	BTC, XBT, ₿	Satoshi Nakamoto	SHA-256d	C++	PoW	The first and most widely used decentralized ledger currency, with the highest market capitalization as of 2018.
2011	Litecoin	LTC, Ł	Charlie Lee	Scrypt	C++	PoW	One of the first cryptocurrencies to use scrypt as a hashing algorithm.
2011	Namecoin	NMC	Vincent Durham	SHA-256d	C++	PoW	Also acts as an alternative, decentralized DNS.
2012	Peercoin	PPC	Sunny King (pseudonym)	SHA-256d	C++	PoW & PoS	The first cryptocurrency to use both PoW and PoS functions.
2013	Dogecoin	DOGE, XDG, Ð	Jackson Palmer & Billy Markus	Scrypt	C++	PoW	Based on the Doge internet meme.
2013	Gridcoin	GRC	Rob Hälford	Scrypt	C++	Decentralized PoS	Linked to citizen science through the Berkeley Open Infrastructure for Network Computing
2013	Primecoin	XPM	Sunny King (pseudonym)	1CC/2CC/TWN	TypeScript, C++	PoW	Uses the finding of prime chains composed of Cunningham chains and bi-twin chains for proof-of-work.
2013	Ripple	XRP	Chris Larsen & Jed McCaleb	ECDSA	C++	"Consensus"	Designed for peer-to-peer debt transfer. Not based on bitcoin.
2013	Nxt	NXT	BCNext (pseudonym)	SHA-256d	Java	PoS	Specifically designed as a flexible platform to build applications and financial services around its protocol.
2014	Auroracoin	AUR	Baldur Odinsson (pseudonym)	Scrypt	C++	PoW	Created as an alternative currency for Iceland, intended to replace the Icelandic króna.
2014	Dash	DASH	Evan Duffield	X11	C++	PoW & Proof of Service (Note: Via Masternodes containing 1000 DASH held as collateral for "Proof of Service". Through an automated voting mechanism, one Masternode is selected per block and receives 45% of mining rewards.)	A bitcoin-based currency featuring instant transactions, decentralized governance and budgeting, and private transactions.
2014	NEO	NEO	Da Hongfei & Erik Zhang	SHA-256 & RIPEMD160	C#	dBFT	China based cryptocurrency, formerly ANT Shares and ANT Coins. The names were changed in 2017 to NEO and GAS.
2014	MazaCoin	MZC	BTC Oyate Initiative	SHA-256d	C++	PoW	The underlying software is derived from that of another cryptocurrency, ZetaCoin.
2014	Monero	XMR	Monero Core Team	RandomX	C++	PoW	Privacy-centric coin based on the CryptoNote protocol with improvements for scalability and decentralization.
2014	Titcoin	TIT	Edward Mansfield & Richard Allen	SHA-256d	TypeScript, C++	PoW	The first cryptocurrency to be nominated for a major adult industry award.
2014	Verge	XVG	Sunerok	Scrypt, x17, groestl, blake2s, and lyra2rev2	C, C++	PoW	Features anonymous transactions using Tor.
2014	Stellar	XLM	Jed McCaleb	Stellar Consensus Protocol (SCP)	C, C++	Stellar Consensus Protocol (SCP)	Open-source, decentralized global financial network.
2014	Vertcoin	VTC	David Muller	Verthash	C++	PoW	Aims to be ASIC resistant.
2015	Ethereum	ETH, Ξ	Vitalik Buterin	Ethash	C++, Go	PoW, PoS	Supports Turing-complete smart contracts.
2015	Ethereum Classic	ETC		EtcHash/Thanos		PoW	An alternative version of Ethereum whose blockchain does not include the DAO hard fork. Supports Turing-complete smart contracts.
2015	Nano	XNO, Ӿ	Colin LeMahieu	Blake2	C++	Open Representative Voting	Decentralized, feeless, open-source, peer-to-peer cryptocurrency. First to use a Block Lattice structure.
2015	Tether	USDT	Jan Ludovicus van der Velde	Omnicore		PoW	Tether claims to be backed by USD at a 1 to 1 ratio. The company has been unable to produce promised audits.
2016	Firo	FIRO	Poramin Insom	Merkle tree Proof	C++	PoW	The first financial system employing Zero-knowledge proof to protect users' privacy. It conducted the world's first large-scale blockchain election for Thailand Democrat Party in 2018.
2016	Zcash	ZEC	Zooko Wilcox	Equihash	C++	PoW	The first open, permissionless financial system employing zero-knowledge security.
2017	Bitcoin Cash	BCH		SHA-256d		PoW	Hard fork from bitcoin, increased maximum block size from 1MB to 8MB (as of 2018, 32MB)
2017	EOS.IO	EOS	Dan Larimer		WebAssembly, Rust, C, C++	delegated PoS	Feeless Smart contract platform for decentralized applications and decentralized autonomous corporations with a block time of 500 ms.
2017	Cardano	ADA, ₳	Charles Hoskinson	Ouroboros, PoS Algorithm	Haskell	PoS	Proof-of-stake blockchain platform: developed via evidence-based methods and peer-reviewed research.
2017	Tron	TRX	Justin Sun		Java, Solidity		
2018	AmbaCoin						official cryptocurrency of the Cameroonian separatist entity of Ambazonia
2018	Nervos Network	CKB	Kevin Wang, Daniel Lv, Terry Tai	Eaglesong	Rust, JavaScript, C	PoW	Multi-layered blockchain smart contract platform
2019	Algorand	ALGO	Silvio Micali		Go	PoS	Uses a verifiable random function to randomly select groups of users to certify blocks.
2020	Avalanche	AVAX	Emin Gün Sirer, Kevin Sekniqi, Maofan "Ted" Yin			PoS	
2020	Shiba Inu	SHIB	Ryoshi			PoS	
2020	Polkadot	DOT	Gavin Wood		Rust	PoS	
2020	Solana	SOL	Anatoly Yakovenko		Rust	PoS	
2021	DeSo	DESO	Nader al-Naji (aka diamondhands)		Go	PoW	Also a social media platform, resembling Twitter. Known as BitClout until September 2021.
2021	SafeMoon	SAFEMOON	SafeMoon LLC		Solidity	PoW	
2023	Arkham Intel Exchange	ARKM	Miguel Morel		Solidity	PoS	

== Inactive currencies ==
Release	Currency	Symbol	Founder(s)	Hash algorithm	Programming language of implementation	Cryptocurrency blockchain (PoS, PoW, or other)	Notes
2014	Coinye	KOI, COYE		Scrypt		PoW	Used American hip hop artist Kanye West as its mascot, abandoned after he filed a trademark lawsuit.
2014	OneCoin		Ruja Ignatova and Stephen Greenwood				A Ponzi scheme promoted as a cryptocurrency.
2017	BitConnect	BCC					BitConnect was described as an open source, all-in-one bitcoin and crypto community platform but was later discovered to be a Ponzi scheme.
2018	KodakCoin		Kodak and WENN Digital	Ethash			KodakCoin is a "photographer-centric" blockchain cryptocurrency used for payments for licensing photographs.
2018	Petro		Venezuelan Government	onixCoin	C++		Stated by Nicolás Maduro to be backed by Venezuela's reserves of oil. As of August 2018 it does not appear to function as a currency.
2018	PlusToken						A ponzi scheme which mainly had investors in China and South Korea.

== See also ==
- Cryptojacking
- List of digital currencies
- Tornado Cash — Ethereum cryptocurrency tumbler
