= Sonny King =

Sonny King may refer to:

- Sonny King (singer) (1922–2006), American lounge singer
- Sonny King (artist) (born 1940), Australian artist
- Sonny King (wrestler) (1945–2024), ring name of Larry Johnson
- Sunny King, pseudonym of the developer of the Primecoin and Peercoin cryptocurrencies

== See also ==
- Sunny King Criterium, a criterium cycling race series
- Sun King, Louis XIV (1638–1715), King of France
- King Sunny Adé, Nigerian juju singer, songwriter, multi-instrumentalist
- Sonny Is King, 1963 album by Sonny Terry
