= Aggelos Kiayias =

Greek cryptographer and computer scientist

Aggelos Kiayias FRSE
- Citizenship: Greek
- Education: University of Athens; City University of New York
- Awards: BCS Lovelace Medal (2024); FRSE (2021)
- Scientific career
- Fields: Computer Science; Cryptography; Cryptocurrency; Electronic voting
- Workplaces: University of Edinburgh; University of Athens; University of Connecticut
- Doctoral advisor: Moti Yung, Stathis Zachos

Aggelos Kiayias (Greek: Άγγελος Κιαγιάς) is a Greek cryptographer and computer scientist. He is a professor at the University of Edinburgh and the chief science officer at Input Output Global (formerly IOHK), the blockchain company that developed Cardano.

== Education ==
Kiayias received his PhD in 2002 at the City University of New York; his advisors were Moti Yung and Stathis Zachos.

== Career and research ==
Kiayias is the chair in cyber security and privacy, and director of the Blockchain Technology Laboratory at the University of Edinburgh, as well as a member of its Laboratory for Foundations of Computer Science. He is also the chief scientist at the blockchain technology company Input Output Global. Previously he worked at the University of Connecticut and at the National and Kapodistrian University of Athens. In 2017, Kiayias started a blockchain course, making Edinburgh “one of the first big European universities to launch a blockchain course”, according to the Financial Times. The Blockchain Technology Laboratory is based in the Bayes Centre at the university. It investigates decentralized systems in collaboration with industry and government bodies. By 2021, the laboratory listed nine staff and 21 researchers and PhD students. In that year Kiayias was elected Fellow of the Royal Society of Edinburgh (FRSE).

Kiayias has worked in a number of cryptographic areas:

- Primarily, he investigated and designed algorithms in the area of cryptocurrency: developing the Cardano blockchain platform and the Ouroboros protocol for the proof of stake mechanism.
- In addition, he has worked on topics such as group signatures, traitor tracing, anonymity, and key generation (see some selected publications below and).
- He has also worked on cryptographic voting systems.

Kiayias has served on program committees and organizing committees of numerous cryptography conferences. In particular, within forums organized by the International Association for Cryptologic Research, he served as the general chair of Eurocrypt 2013, and as the program chair of Public Key Cryptography (PKC) 2020, and served on the steering committee of the Real World Crypto Symposium during 2013–21. He chaired the blockchain session at the IACR conference Crypto 2022. He was named to the 2025 class of ACM Fellows.

In 2026 he was elected a Fellow of the International Association for Cryptologic Research, with a citation for contributions to cryptographic design, including the science and implementation of blockchains, for educational leadership, and for service to the association.

He is chair of the eighth international conference on Advances in Financial Technologies (AFT 2026), held in the UK for 2026 at the London School of Economics from 6 to 9 October 2026. The conference series focuses on research into financial infrastructure including cryptocurrencies, blockchains and exchanges.

=== Blockchain research ===
Kiayias has described how the problem of debt-ridden banks in Greece inspired him to concentrate his research on creating a blockchain to widen access to financial services using a digital "parallel currency". The excessive computer processing power needed for proof-of-work blockchain protocols such as Bitcoin led him to work on proof-of-stake blockchain protocols.

In 2016, he led a team that published an ePrint paper (number 889, dated September 12) describing the Ouroboros blockchain consensus protocol.

In 2017 Kiayias began teaching a blockchain course at the University of Edinburgh.

In 2019, Kiayias published a paper with Emilios Avgouleas of Edinburgh's law school, on blockchain technology and systemic risk.

In 2021, New Scientist quoted Kiayias on the resource consumption of the Chia cryptocurrency, saying that while Chia was less intensive than Bitcoin, that was clearing "a low bar as far as 'green' technology is concerned".

Other research has described using ideas from game theory to maintain Nash equilibrium and enable an economically sustainable, privacy-preserving mixnet.

Kiayias was awarded the 2024 BCS Lovelace Medal for his work on cyber security and cryptography.

=== Electronic voting ===
From 2003, at the University of Connecticut, Kiayias focused his research on privacy and secure electronic voting using cryptography. In 2006, he led a team that discovered security flaws in Diebold AccuVote-OS machines (the “Optical Scan Report”) in a study supported by the Office of the Connecticut Secretary of the State. Unlike previous studies, the flaws were discovered by experimenting with the machine and without any access to the AV-OS source code.

In 2015, The Wall Street Journal reported that Kiayias, by then professor of cryptography and computer security at the University of Athens, had led a team that had developed an encrypted electronic voting system for Greece. The article described the system as being based on a "distributed, publicly-available ledger" with voters being given electronic keys "akin to the blockchain's private and public key combination which authenticates bitcoin transactions". However, the WSJ pointed to political motives that might hinder the application of such technology: "the current Greek government is not interested [in electronic voting] because it's worried about the potential disruption that new voting systems could unleash amongst young, technologically-savvy and mobile electorates". It quoted Kiayias: "The previous Greek government was pro e-voting, but the new one isn't … Every time there is a modification of the voting infrastructure, you may also modify the population that actually participates in the vote."

In 2017, at Scotland’s Democratic Future: Exploring Electronic Voting, a conference organised by the Scottish Government Elections Team and the University of Edinburgh School of Informatics, Kiayias said "cryptography provides a thorough methodology for designing and formally establishing the security of voting systems" and that in terms of e-voting technology, "Scotland can do this, and it can be exemplary". The event was cited by Joe FitzPatrick MSP, the Minister for Parliamentary Business, in a written answer about the Scottish government’s digital strategy and its work on online voting systems.

Kiayias is a member of the Institution of Engineering and Technology’s working group on electronic voting, which produced a 2020 report "Internet voting in the UK", discussing the issues, challenges and risks of the technology.

A Fortune magazine article in the lead-up to the 2020 US presidential elections discussed the legal and logistical challenges of implementing an online voting system for the country. Kiayias commented: “The US is living with a voting system designed 200 years ago.”

== Selected publications ==
- Juan A. Garay, David S. Johnson, Aggelos Kiayias, Moti Yung: The combinatorics of hidden diversity. Theor. Comput. Sci. 812: 80–95 (2020)
- Juan A. Garay, Aggelos Kiayias, Nikos Leonardos: The Bitcoin Backbone Protocol: Analysis and Applications. EUROCRYPT (2) 2015: 281–310
- Aggelos Kiayias, Serdar Pehlivanoglu: Encryption for Digital Content. Advances in Information Security 52 (a book), Springer 2010, ISBN 978-1-4419-0043-2, pp. 1–197
- Babak Azimi-Sadjadi, Aggelos Kiayias, Alejandra Mercado, Bülent Yener: Robust key generation from signal envelopes in wireless networks. CCS 2007: 401–410
- Aggelos Kiayias, Yiannis Tsiounis, Moti Yung: Traceable Signatures. EUROCRYPT 2004: 571–589
- Yevgeniy Dodis, Aggelos Kiayias, Antonio Nicolosi, Victor Shoup: Anonymous Identification in Ad Hoc Groups. EUROCRYPT 2004: 609–626
- Aggelos Kiayias, Moti Yung: Robust verifiable, non-interactive zero sharing: A plug-in utility for enhanced voters’ privacy, in: Dimitris A. Gritzalis (ed.) Secure Electronic Voting, Springer, 2003. ISBN 978-1402073014: pp. 139–152
- Aggelos Kiayias, Moti Yung: Traitor Tracing with Constant Transmission Rate. EUROCRYPT 2002: 450–465
- Aggelos Kiayias, Moti Yung: Self Protecting Pirates and Black-Box Traitor Tracing. CRYPTO 2001: 63–79

== Sources ==
- Kiayias' personal website
- Kiayias' DBLP page
- Kiayias' Google Scholar page
- Video Interview with Kiayias regarding Smart Contract Research
- Kiayias' IACR publications and committee service page
- Computing Review Page on Kiayias
