= Virtual Currency Girls =

All-female J-pop band active from 2018 to 2021

Kasotsuka Shojo (Virtual Currency Girls) ([仮想通貨少女]) was an all-girl J-pop band active for three years from 2018. The band became famous worldwide and a poster child for cryptocurrencies and Japan’s crypto boom. Pictures of the band members in their lucha libre Mexican wrestling masks are still used to illustrate crypto features.

The band's first live performance was on 12 January 2018 at Miyaji Gakki Zippal Hall in the Kanda district of Tokyo. Admission was free, but merchandise could only be paid for in Bitcoin and Ethereum. The show was reported in newspapers, magazines and media websites across the globe, as well as by broadcasters. In the West, these included The Verge, the Financial Times, the BBC, Barron's and Forbes. The Week, a British-American weekly news magazine, described them as “the world’s first cryptocurrency-themed pop group". The cyberpunk writer Bruce Sterling noted their arrival for Wired while Japan Today called the band's fame "an incredible gimmick". They were regarded as a sign of the hype around blockchain.

Kasotsuka Shojo was used in online media and books to summarize what was happening in Japan with Bitcoin and Ethereum, and in cryptocurrencies more generally. In a film documentary, the Wall Street Journal said creating a band for crypto marketing purposes "epitomize[d] Japan’s crypto craze". The country was a "true crypto paradise ... in part thanks to supportive government regulations".

== History ==
Kasotsuka Shojo was formed by the Cinderella Academy, a Japanese talent agent, at a time when there were already 6,000 cryptocurrencies. The company said it chose each member from the “zodiac constellation” of idol groups it managed. According to the Japanese entertainment news website Natalie, Virtual Currency Girls were a spin-off from Hoshiza Hyakkei (星座百景グレート, "100 Constellations"). All but one of the members came from that group.

Each band member adopted the guise of a specific cryptocurrency. They said their aim was to educate people about the crypto world in song and dance. The eight band members and their cryptocurrencies were:

1. 18-year-old Rara Naruse (Bitcoin Cash)
2. 16-year-old Hinano Sirahama (Bitcoin)
3. Age-unreleased Ami Amo (Ethereum)
4. 22-year-old Suzuka Minami (NEO)
5. Age-unreleased Momo Aisu (Mona Coin)
6. 17-year-old Kanako Matsuzawa (Cardano)
7. 17-year-old Koharu Kamikawa (NEM)
8. 15-year-old Hinata Kozuki (Ripple).

CNET gave different versions of some band member names as well as links to their Twitter feeds.

Rara, the group's leader, said the band's merchandise had to be bought with a cryptocurrency, as did their concert tickets. Each singer's salary was paid in cryptocurrency. At the time, there was a cryptocurrency "frenzy" in Japan because Bitcoin was accepted as legal tender. A third of the global Bitcoin trade was in yen.

Each singer wore a frilly mini-skirt and French maid apron with knee-high socks and a Mexican lucha libre professional-wrestling mask. Such outfits are popular costumes in Japan’s anime and cosplay circles. A cryptocurrency was shown as a symbol on the mask each singer wore. The idea was to form a globally recognisable "uniform", Rara said.

An article about "crazy" cryptocurrency stories included the group and said it had its “ups and downs” because the Bitcoin character (Hinano) "went to war" with Bitcoin Cash (Rara) for control of the band.

The band reappeared in 2001 with three more tracks to coincide with the craze for non-fungible tokens (NFTs). The official website showed just seven band members (no Bitcoin girl) and changes to the line-up: Rara Naruse (Bitcoin Cash), Karen Ito (Ethereum), Yuna Himekawa (NEO), Nika Miizoiri (Mona), Kanako Matsuzawa (Cardano), Haruka Kamikawa (NEM), and Hinata Katsuki (Ripple).

== NEM hack setback ==
A few weeks after the band launched there was a theft of US$530 million in NEM from Coincheck and the crypto exchange had to be suspended. In a news story for The Daily Beast, the journalist and Tokyo Vice author Jake Adelstein reported that the girls feared the freezing of their accounts at Coincheck would delay their salaries. Koharu had stern words for the hacker. “It's absolutely bad. I want to say to the hacker, ‘You jerk, you stupid jerk.’ Give everyone back their NEM!”

Even so, the band performed at a concert with Coincheck owners in the audience on February 16 at Future Seven in Tokyo.

Two months later, the BBC’s File on 4 reported that the girls were still waiting to get their cash. BBC journalist Peter White interviewed Rara and Hinano, saying they were still at school.

== Wall Street Journal documentary ==
In October 2018, the Wall Street Journal, a US financial newspaper, made a video documentary in Japan about creating its own cryptocurrency, called WSJCoin: Yes, We Created Our Own Cryptocurrency. The video was given a premiere screening in Hong Kong and followed by a discussion panel of industry experts. It was promoted in a WSJ Wealth Adviser briefing. The reporter Steven Russolillo described Kasotsuka Shojo as epitomizing Japan’s crypto craze, although he said, "The mania has fizzled [out]."

The documentary includes clips of Kasotsuka Shojo playing and interviews with the band members. Russolillo said the band was created by someone (who is not named) for marketing purposes because crypto was such a big business. Suzuka said, "We all used to be in a different band. One day we were suddenly told: 'You are now the Virtual Currency Girls.' We were given masks and these maid costumes. That's how our new band started."

The WSJ reporter asks for advice on creating a new crypto and Suzuka says, "Why don't you wear a mask like this as well." The WSJCoin was created in Japan by the co-founder of a local startup called Soramitsu.

A month later, the paper followed up on the documentary and again featured Kasotsuka Shojo. However, the release of WSJCoin was blocked because it would create a conflict of interest for journalists on the Wall Street Journal.

== Tracks ==
The first single was “The Moon, Cryptocurrencies and Me” in January 2018. Kasotsuka Shojo sang in Japanese. The lyrics are about the benefits and dangers of cryptocurrencies. Examples include: "Paper [money] is over. It’s the digital age… Also are you thinking about taxes [on your earnings]… You put better some away. If you forget, the tax office will come for you someday!" They include warnings like "It's hell if you buy at a high price!", "Don't forget about two-step verification", and "Never use the same password twice."

Barron’s, the American finance magazine, described the track as “an electro-pop reflection of digital money and the dangers of the crypto world, punctuated by a chorus of eight teenage girls shouting the cryptos they represent”. The business news website Quartz said it was a "lecture on online security and watching out for fraudulent crypto businesses".

For the second single, “NFT The World”, released as a video on July 30, 2021 there were Japanese and English versions. The video was filmed at Nikko Edomura, a Japanese cultural theme park. The other tracks were "Oreno Nawa Blockchain" (My Name is Blockchain) and "Tsukito Kasotsukato Watashi" (The Moon and Depopulation and Me). These were released at Apple Music and other streaming services as instrumentals as well as with lyrics.

Photographs of the Virtual Currency Girls are sold by Reuters and Getty Images, which lists the band's photographs as Japanese symbols for money.
