= Bülent Yener =

Professor of computer science

Bulent Yener
- Education: Columbia University
- Awards: IEEE Fellow (2015)
- Scientific career
- Fields: Computer Science; Computer Communications Networks; Information Security; Biomedical informatics
- Workplaces: Rensselaer Polytechnic Institute; Bell Laboratories
- Doctoral advisors: Terrance E. Boult, Moti Yung

Bulent Yener is a Professor in the Department of Computer Science and in the Department of Electrical, Computer and Systems Engineering, and the founding Director of Data Science Research Center at Rensselaer Polytechnic Institute (RPI) in Troy, New York.

Before joining RPI, he was a Member of the Technical Staff at the Bell Laboratories in Murray Hill, New Jersey.

Yener received his MS. and Ph.D. degrees in Computer Science, both from Columbia University, in 1987 and 1994, respectively. His Ph.D. advisers were Terrance E. Boult and Moti Yung.

Yener has worked primarily on:

- Computer Communications Networks (Wireless Network, Internet Research, Overlay Networks, and VPNs),
- Information Security and Privacy (including his well reported work on chatroom surveillance study), and
- Biomedical problems related to the broad subject of Engineering in Biology and Medicine.
- Artificial Intelligence and Machine Learning.
- Data Science.

His work in various domains has followed the pattern of problem modeling, data analysis, followed by optimization, with the goal of reaching new insights into traditional subjects by employing combinatorics and machine learning techniques. For example, Yener has developed the "cell-graphs" approach to model and interpret structure-function relationships which is widely applied in digital pathology area; he also developed cryptographic key pre-distribution system from Combinatorial design and BIBD in particular. See his full list of publications in.

Dr. Yener was a Marie Curie Fellow 2009-2010. In 2015 he was named a Fellow of the Institute of Electrical and Electronics Engineers (IEEE) for contributions to network design optimization and security.

== Selected publications ==
- 2020: "Adaptive Sketching for Fast and Convergent Canonical Polyadic Decomposition." (with Alex Gittens, and Kareem S. Aggour), ICML 2020: 3566-3575
- 2019: "Cybersecurity in the Era of Data Science: Examining New Adversarial Models." (with Tsvi Gal), IEEE Secur. Priv. 17(6): 46-53 (2019)
- 2018: "Accelerating a Distributed CPD Algorithm for Large Dense, Skewed Tensors." (with Kareem S. Aggour, and Alex Gittens), IEEE BigData 2018: 408-417
- 2016: "Prediction of Growth Factor-Dependent Cleft Formation During Branching Morphogenesis Using A Dynamic Graph-Based Growth Model." (with Nimit Dhulekar, Shayoni Ray, Daniel Yuan, Abhirami Baskaran, Basak Oztan, and Melinda Larsen), IEEE ACM Trans. Comput. Biol. Bioinform. 13(2): 350-364 (2016)
- 2016: "A Formal Framework for Environmentally Sensitive Malware." (with Jeremy Blackthorne, and Benjamin Kaiser), RAID 2016: 211-229
- 2013: "Biologically-driven cell-graphs for breast tissue grading." (with Basak Oztan, Katherine R. Shubert, Chris S. Bjornsson, and George E. Plopper), ISBI 2013: 137-140
- 2012: "Effective graph classification based on topological and label attributes." (with Geng Li, Murat Semerci, and Mohammed J. Zaki), Stat. Anal. Data Min. 5(4): 265-283 (2012)
- 2011: "On passive inference attacks against physical-layer key extraction." (with Matthew Edman, and Aggelos Kiayias), EUROSEC 2011: 8
- 2009: "Privacy-Preserving Information Markets for Computing Statistical Data." (with Aggelos Kiayias, and Moti Yung), Financial Cryptography 2009: 32-50
- 2007: "Robust key generation from signal envelopes in wireless networks." (with Babak Azimi-Sadjadi, Aggelos Kiayias, and Alejandra Mercado), ACM's CCS 2007: 401-410
- 2004: "Combinatorial Design of Key Distribution Mechanisms for Wireless Sensor Networks. (with Seyit Ahmet Çamtepe), ESORICS 2004: 293-308
- 2001: "Provisioning a virtual private network: a network design problem for multicommodity flow." (with Anupam Gupta, Jon Kleinberg, Amit Kumar, and Rajeev Rastogi), STOC 2001: 389-398
