= Emilios Avgouleas =

Greek professor and researcher

Emilios Avgouleas is a Greek professor and researcher specialising in international financial markets and blockchain technology. He holds the chair in international banking law and finance at the University of Edinburgh. He is a member of the stakeholder group of the European Banking Authority.

He is also an independent member of the Euro-working group select panel for the Hellenic Financial Stability Fund, which was set up to stabilize the Greek banking sector during the 2010 banking crisis.

== Education ==
Avgouleas graduated in law from the University of Athens, and in 1999 gained his doctorate in law and economics from the London School of Economics.

== Career ==
Avgouleas practised law as an associate at Clifford Chance and in investment banks. By 2000, he was a partner at Linklaters and then Tsibanoulis & Partners in Athens. In 2007, he switched into academia, taking up the post of professor of international financial markets and financial law at the University of Manchester.

In 2012, he moved to the University of Edinburgh, as a professor of international banking. He is an associate director of the Edinburgh Centre for Commercial Law.

He is also on the staff of Edinburgh University's blockchain technology lab and IOHK, the blockchain engineering company developing Cardano.

Avgouleas was called as an expert witness by the House of Lords select committee on the European Union for a 2012 report on MiFID II.

Since 2015, he has been a member of the stakeholder group of the European Banking Authority.

Visiting professorships include Yale, Harvard, National University of Singapore, Hong Kong University, Duke Law School, China University of Political Science and Law, and the Athens University of Economics and Business.

On the issue of the coronavirus crisis, he warned in 2020 that if it lasted more than a few months, "Tens of millions of jobs could be lost despite trillions of dollars being spent on saving businesses and industries". Furthermore, it could be "the kiss of death for countries and the stability of their financial systems".

== Findings on the Greek banking crisis ==
Avgouleas was critical of early attempts to stabilize the Greek banking sector during the banking crisis after a bailout by the EU and International Monetary Fund (IMF) in 2010. In 2014, he delivered a paper on ethics and restoring confidence at a conference organised by the Hellenic Bank Association, Greece’s national banking trade group. That same year he published a "critical evaluation" of bank bail-in regimes with Charles Goodhart. In 2015, he described the disposal of banking assets as "a fire sale", resulting in an "enormous loss" for Greek taxpayers.

Avgouleas was appointed in January 2016 as an independent member of a selection and evaluation panel for board members of the Hellenic Financial Stability Fund, and contributed to the interim and final financial reports. He returned to the issue of bank bail-ins with Goodhart at the end of the year.

In May 2018, he worked on a Centre for Economic Policy Research (CEPR) report that began: "A spectre continues to haunt Greece and no less its creditors." It then discussed debt relief, and how schemes could be structured so as to provide the right incentives for budgetary discipline. He also contributed to a CEPR commentary that characterised Greece’s third economic programme as "unlike its two predecessors" in being "relatively successful". In late 2018, he said a "radical" move by the Greek central bank to buy up non-performing loans held by the country’s banks "has to be welcomed".

In a Financial Times article about addressing Greek bank debt, he pointed to a high level of non-performing loans compared with other EU member states. This came after "a long period of inertia by bank boards and regulatory authorities" as a result of "close relationships between politicians, bankers and favoured businessmen".

At the end of 2019, Avgouleas said that Greece needed infrastructure investment from China after 10 years of financial devastation: "Its stock of capital investment has to be replenished. The only available capital investors are the Chinese."

A 2020 paper with economist Rym Ayadi proposing a technology-driven private-public initiative to enhance debt transparency and management in low-income and lower-middle-income countries was published as a G20 Insights policy brief.

== Selected works ==
- Avgouleas, E, and Goodhart, C (2019) "Bank Resolution a Decade after the Global Financial Crisis: A Systematic Reappraisal", in Systemic Risk in the Financial Sector, p. 31-46.
- Avgouleas, E and Kiayias, A (2019) "The Promise of Blockchain Technology for Global Securities and Derivatives Markets: The New Financial Ecosystem and the ‘Holy Grail’ of Systemic Risk Containment European Business Organization Law Review, 20, p. 81–110.
- Avgouleas, E, and Donald, DC, (eds) (2019) The Political Economy of Financial Regulation, Cambridge University Press.
- Avgouleas, E (2018) Capital Markets Union in Europe, Oxford University Press.
- Avgouleas, E (2012) Governance of Global Financial Markets: The Law, the Economics, the Politics, Cambridge University Press.
- Avgouleas, E (2005) The Mechanics and Regulation of Market Abuse: A Legal and Economic Analysis, Oxford University Press.
