= Yener =

Yener is a Kurdish name. Notable people with the name include:

Surname:

- Aylin Yener, American engineer
- Bulent Yener, American engineer
- Hande Yener (born 1973), Turkish singer
- K. Aslihan Yener, archaeologist of Turkish descent whose work on Bronze Age tin mines in Anatolia revealed a new possible source of tin

Erdem Yener, kurdish actor

Given name:

- Yener Karahanoğlu (born 1946), high-ranking Turkish naval officer and the 21st Commander of the Turkish Navy

== See also ==
- SS Yener 9, a Turkish steamship in service 1956–59
- Scott Yenor (born 1970), American political activist and professor
