= Bitconnect =

2016–2018 fraudulent cryptocurrency

Bitconnect Coin

Denominations
- Code: BCC

Development
- Original author: Satish Kumbhani
- Initial release: February 15, 2016
- Development status: Discontinued
- Written in: C++ C#
- Operating system: Windows, OS X, Linux, Android, iOS
- Source model: Open source
- License: MIT License

Ledger
- Timestamping scheme: Proof of stake/Proof of work (hybrid)
- Block reward: 0.42% every 15 days; 10% inflation per year
- Block time: 60 seconds

Website
- Website: bitconnect.co at the Wayback Machine (archived 2018-11-28)

Bitconnect (stylized bitconnect and also spelled BitConnect, ticker code BCC) was an open-source cryptocurrency from 2016 to 2018 that was connected with a high-yield investment program, a type of Ponzi scheme. After the platform administrators closed the earning platform on January 16, 2018, and refunded the users' investments in BCC following a 92% coin value crash, confidence was lost and the value of the coin plummeted to below $1 from a previous high of nearly $525.

== History ==
Bitconnect was released in 2016 to allow users to lend the value of Bitconnect Coin in return for interest payments. The marquee program was the so-called lending platform where users traded Bitcoin for Bitconnect Coin and could lock in the instantaneous value of the coin for a set period of time while earning interest calculated daily. The interest payouts were determined by a so-called "trading bot". The trading bot was the most controversial piece of the Bitconnect.co system. The liquidity of the BCC cryptocurrency funded users' ability to exchange their earnings for Bitcoin.

On November 7, 2017, the government of the United Kingdom issued Bitconnect a notice with two months to prove its legitimacy.

On January 3, 2018, Texas State Securities Board issued a cease and desist to the company, calling it a Ponzi scheme, and citing failings in user earnings transparency, and misleading statements. Texas State Security Board and North Carolina Secretary of State Securities Division warned that Bitconnect was not registered to sell securities in their respective states.

On January 17, 2018, Bitconnect shut down, and BCC prices crashed by 92% immediately after. Bitconnect announced it would refund its loans.

On January 31, 2018, a temporary restraining order froze Bitconnect's assets, expiring on February 13. However, Bitconnect as an entity never actually existed, so it is unclear what assets Bitconnect has (or ever had). An alleged India-region leader (one level below the founder) of Bitconnect, Divyesh Darji, was arrested in Delhi, India, on August 18, 2018. It is suspected that Darji is connected to well-known criminal entities involved in laundering so-called "Black Money" after the Indian government's demonetization of the rupee. In 2019, Darji was arrested and released on bail in connection with a similar scam called Regal Coin.

== Criticism and collapse ==
Bitconnect was suspected of being a Ponzi scheme because of its multilevel marketing structure and impossibly high payouts (1% daily compounded interest). Bitconnect interest fluctuated greatly with the volatility of Bitcoin, which its value was tied to.

The Bitconnect Coin was among the world's top 20 most successful cryptocurrency tokens until its price collapsed after traders began losing confidence. BCC rose from a post-ICO price of $0.17 to an all-time high of US$463 in December 2017; it declined to US$0.40 as of March 11, 2019. Bitconnect released outstanding loans at US$363.62 to the Bitconnect Wallet in the form of BCC. However, soon after that news the internal exchange price and liquidity collapsed resulting in a nearly complete loss of value.

== Legal issues ==
On January 16, 2018, Bitconnect announced it would shut down its cryptocurrency exchange and lending operation after regulators from Texas and North Carolina issued a cease and desist order against it. On January 31, 2018, a U.S. District Court, Western District of Kentucky, granted a temporary restraining order freezing Bitconnect's assets and "to disclose cryptocurrency wallet and trading account addresses, as well as the identities of anyone to whom Bitconnect has sent digital currencies within the last 90 days".

In September 2021, the U.S. Securities and Exchange Commission sued Bitconnect, alongside its founder Indian Satish Kumbhani, American Glenn Arcaro, who served as Bitconnect's lead national promoter in the United States from August 2017 to January 2018, and Future Money LTD, a company Arcaro created to lure into Bitconnect's lending program. The SEC alleged that Bitconnect defrauded U.S. investors a total of $2.4 billion.

Parallel to SEC civil charges, the United States Department of Justice (DOJ) had initiated criminal charges against Arcaro. On September 1, 2021, Arcaro pleaded guilty of criminal charges pressed by the DOJ which includes conspiracy to commit wire fraud and criminal forfeiture. The DOJ also indicted Kumbhani on various federal charges in February 2022, including money laundering and fraud.

On January 12, 2023, a federal district court in San Diego ordered that Arcaro pay $17 million in restitution to be distributed to approximately 800 victims. He also agreed to forfeit more than $24 million, which could also be used in the future to repay victims.

== Internet meme ==
On October 28, 2017, Bitconnect held its first (and only) annual ceremony in Pattaya, Thailand. During the event, an investor named Carlos Matos from New York City gave an exuberant presentation and testimonial about the website, which included him intensely screaming "Bitconnect!" several times in a variety of registers; this quickly became an Internet meme. Both the Internet meme and the questionable practices of Bitconnect were profiled and parodied by John Oliver and Keegan-Michael Key on the program Last Week Tonight.

== See also ==
- List of cryptocurrencies
- OneCoin
- PlusToken
- USI Tech
