= USI Tech =

Defunct Dubai-based cryptocurrency Ponzi scheme

- United Software Intelligence
- Founded: c. 2017
- Founding location: United Arab Emirates
- Years active: 2017–2018
- Territory: Global
- Activities: Ponzi scheme, high-yield investment program

USI Tech Limited (also known as United Software Intelligence, or stylised as USI-TECH) was a Dubai-based cryptocurrency and forex platform trading provider, suspected to be a high-yield investment program and a Ponzi scheme. Prior to going offline with its users' funds, USI-Tech moved its website from a .com top-level domain, to a .io domain, while also appearing on a number of mirror domains. Joseph Rotunda, Director of the Enforcement Division at the Texas State Securities Board, estimates that the scammers were able to extract hundreds of millions of dollars from all over the world.

== Overview ==
USI Tech promoted investment packages that promised fixed daily or monthly returns through automated cryptocurrency and forex trading. Financial regulators reported that neither the company nor its sales agents were registered to offer securities in multiple jurisdictions. Investigations by the Texas State Securities Board and other regulatory authorities concluded that USI Tech exhibited characteristics commonly associated with Ponzi schemes, including the use of new investor and the lack of verifiable trading activity capable of producing the advertised returns. USI Tech operators extracted over US$150 million from investors worldwide before the platform went offline.

== Promoters ==
Based on reports from Engadget, USI was initially promoted by Lee Oakey, Kerry Stockton, Rodney Burton, and Michael Faust. Oakey and Stockton are British, and currently live in Australia. Burton (49, in 2018), also known as "Bitcoin Rodney", was known for purchasing a $350,000 Lamborghini Huracan from Lamborghini Newport Beach in Costa Mesa, California, using Bitcoin. Burton was released from jail in 2010 after serving five years for drug dealing.

Dan Putnam, who identifies as the CEO of R&D Global, a suspected USI parent company, was also seen boasting that a mere $40 investment can grow to US$10 million in just 18 months at Eyeline Trading. Eyeline's homepage was redirected to USI Tech for a brief period, before also going offline. R&D Global is registered as a limited liability company in Putnam's home state of Utah under the name of Richard Theodore Putnam.

== Related companies ==
=== Eyeline Trading ===
As of March 2019, a domain belonging to USI Tech was redirected to Eyeline Trading, another company claiming to be a cryptocurrency and forex platform trading provider. The redirect suggests that the owners of the original website have relaunched the ponzi scheme through Eyeline Trading, following USI Tech's exposure to law enforcement.

=== Wealthboss ===
Eyeline Trading collapsed following non-payment, and was subsequently rebranded to WealthBoss after British Columbia Securities Commission issued a cautionary notice against dealing with Eyeline.

=== R&D Global ===
According to Engadget, both Eyeline and WealthBoss listed R&D Global as a parent company.

== History ==
- On 20 December 2017, the Texas State Securities Board issued an emergency cease and desist order as neither USI-Tech nor the sales agents, Clifford Thomas and Michael Rivera, were registered to sell securities in Texas.
- On 21 December 2017, the Government of New Brunswick issued a consumer alert against investing at USI-Tech, and advised consumers to contact the Commission if approached about investing in the company.
- On 12 January 2018, the Attorney General of Guam issued a statement advising people to exercise caution when investing at USI Tech.
- On 26 January 2018, the Government of Saskatchewan issued a Cease Trade Order, and requested anyone contacted by USI-TECH to inform the Financial and Consumer Affairs Authority of Saskatchewan.
- On 9 April 2018, the Spanish financial regulator Comisión Nacional del Mercado de Valores added USI-Tech to its warning list of unauthorised firms and entities.
- On 16 August 2018, the Financial Markets Authority of New Zealand updated its warning list to include USI Tech on basis that it is offering financial services and products to residents of New Zealand without authorization, while also warning that the operators have the characteristics of a scam.

== See also ==
- Bitconnect
- OneCoin
- PlusToken
