= GlobeNewswire =

Global press release distributor

GlobeNewswire, Inc.
- Type: Subsidiary
- Industry: Publications; Communications
- Genre: Press release
- Founded: June 1, 1998
- Headquarters: Los Angeles, California, United States
- Products: Newswire service
- Parent: Notified
- Website: globenewswire.com

GlobeNewswire provides press release distribution services globally, with substantial operations in North America, Europe and Asia. In 2025, Notified, the parent company of GlobeNewswire, entered into an agreement to be acquired by Equiniti.

GlobeNewswire was a Nasdaq, Inc. subsidiary from September 2006 until April 2018, when West Corporation acquired Nasdaq's public relations solutions and digital media services businesses, including GlobeNewswire.

Formerly known as PrimeNewswire, the company changed its name to GlobeNewswire in 2008 to reflect its international scope.

== History ==
GlobeNewswire was established in 1998 with the goal of eliminating the 15-minute delay in disclosing financial releases to all media, as well as offering investor relations website management services, hosting online customer service centers, and delivering news via HTML email.

The company delivers corporate press releases, financial disclosures and multimedia content to the media, investment community, individual investors and the public.

In 2012, GlobeNewswire introduced its Streaming Media Player, which allows users to alternate between videos and slides while monitoring a variety of news sources.

In June 2018, GlobeNewswire introduced Media Snippets, allowing organizations to embed images, audio, video, and live streaming into press releases and web pages.

== Notable events ==
=== Fraudulent Walmart press release ===
On September 13, 2021, GlobeNewswire distributed a fraudulent press release claiming that Walmart would begin accepting Litecoin as payment. The announcement was reported by several news organizations, including Reuters and CNBC. Litecoin's price briefly rose by approximately 30% before falling after Walmart denied any partnership with the cryptocurrency.

GlobeNewswire withdrew the release, issued a notice to disregard it, and said it had introduced enhanced authentication procedures and would cooperate with authorities investigating the incident. Litecoin's official Twitter account also shared the announcement before deleting its post. Litecoin creator Charlie Lee described the decision to share it as a mistake.

=== Employee insider trading ===
In September 2022, the Ontario Securities Commission (OSC) and the U.S. Securities and Exchange Commission (SEC) brought insider trading proceedings against Harpreet Saini and John Natividad, software developers at Intrado, the operator of GlobeNewswire. The regulators alleged that the pair used their access to unpublished corporate press releases to trade ahead of market-moving announcements between May 2018 and July 2021. According to the SEC, they collectively traded ahead of more than 1,600 announcements and generated approximately US$1.6 million in profits.

Both men subsequently pleaded guilty to insider trading in Ontario. In 2025, Saini was sentenced to six months less a day in jail and ordered to pay more than C$1.4 million, including disgorgement of trading profits, an additional financial penalty, and a mandatory surcharge. He was also subject to a ten-year trading ban. On September 28, 2026, Natividad was sentenced to 90 days in jail, fined C$360,000 plus a mandatory 25% surcharge, and placed on probation for two years.

== See also ==
- List of press release agencies
- List of California companies
- List of news agencies
