= Ouroboros (protocol) =

Blockchain protocol

The ouroboros, Kekulé's inspiration for the structure of benzene. It is used to symbolize the ever-growing consensus on the Cardano blockchain

Ouroboros is a family of proof-of-stake consensus protocols used in the Cardano and Polkadot blockchains. It can run both permissionless and permissioned blockchains.

Ouroboros was published as "the first provable secure PoS consensus protocol". It was postulated by an academic team led by Aggelos Kiayias at the Annual International Cryptology Conference in 2017. Later that year, Ouroboros (Classic) was implemented by IOHK as the basis of the Cardano blockchain platform and various upgrades. Ouroboros versions include:

- Ouroboros BFT was an interim version used in 2020 to enable the switch between the Classic and Praos versions of Cardano using a hard fork combinator that preserved the blockchain history;
- Ouroboros Praos (2017) provided security against fully-adaptive corruption in the semi-synchronous model. A team at Cornell University discussed Ouroboros Praos and their own provably secure proof-of-stake protocol called Snow White. In 2020, Praos was used to introduce decentralized block production on Cardano by stake pools;
- Ouroboros Genesis (2018) provides security with a dynamic participation model;
- Ouroboros Chronos (2019) is independent of global time;
- Ouroboros Crypsinous (2019) gives higher levels of privacy
- Research in 2020 tested Ouroboros Hydra, a protocol version that used "off-chain state channels" (called "heads") to enable peer-to-peer transactions. Such "layer 2" protocols manage transactions off the main blockchain, and each head could potentially process "up to 1,000 transactions per second". In theory, Ouroboros Hydra could rival the 30,000 simultaneous transactions offered by conventional payment systems such as Visa by running scores of heads.

Cardano's founder Charles Hoskinson has described the Ouroboros consensus mechanism as energy efficient. Nguyen et al. compared Ouroboros to other PoS protocols.
