= Kodak KashMiner =

2018 Bitcoin mining computer scheme

The Kodak KashMiner was a Bitcoin mining computer that was displayed at Kodak's booth at the Consumer Electronics Show in January 2018. It was promoted by Spotlite USA, who had previously licensed the Kodak name for Kodak-branded LED lighting. The initiative was not endorsed by Eastman Kodak.

The plan was that for an up-front fee of around $3,400, customers could rent a KashMiner — apparently a rebranded Bitmain AntMiner S9 — for two years, and keep a cut of any Bitcoins generated. The devices would be housed at Kodak's offices in Rochester, New York, and use surplus power from Kodak's in-house power plant.

The scheme was widely criticized, and branded a "scam." The brochure handed out at the show promised $375 per month payout every month for two years — a payout that would have been impossible with the ever-rising Bitcoin hash rate. A Kodak representative at CES said that the stated rates were "preliminary." The "Kodak" branding was present on the miner at CES on Tuesday 9 January, but by Thursday 11 January the "Kodak" label had been removed and replaced with "Spotlite Digital Assets" branding. BBC News "Tech Tent" declared the Kodak KashMiner and the (unrelated) KODAKCoin plan "Worst Idea" of CES 2018.

In July 2018, Spotlite USA CEO Halston Mikail said that the U.S. Securities and Exchange Commission had put an end to the scheme. Kodak stated that the KashMiner had never been a Kodak-licensed product, and no miners had been installed at their headquarters. The "Kodak HashPower" website had never been finished, with lorem ipsum placeholder text still present on the "Terms and Conditions" and "Privacy Policy" pages in July.
