= Litecoin =

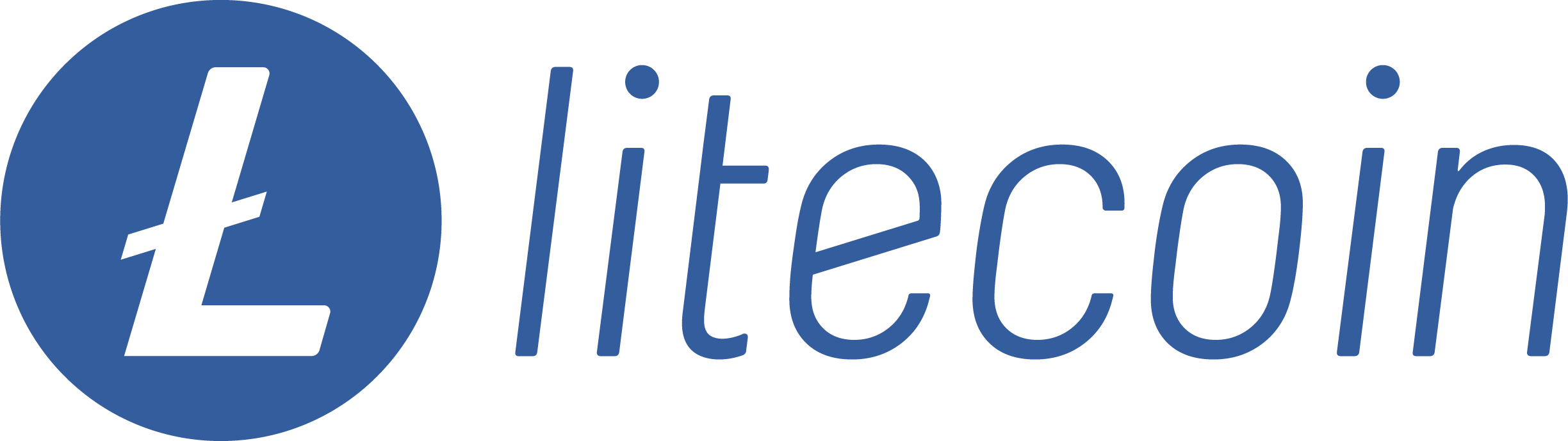
- Official Litecoin logo

Denominations
- Plural: Litecoins
- Code: LTC
- Precision: 10^{−8}
- Subunits
- 1/1000: lites,
- 1/1000000: microlitecoins, photons
- 1/100000000: litoshis

Development
- Original author: Charlie Lee
- Initial release: 0.1.0 / 7 October 2011; 15 years ago
- Latest release: 0.21.5.6 / 2 August 2026; 3 months ago
- Code repository: github.com/litecoin-project/litecoin
- Development status: Active
- Project fork of: Bitcoin (Note: Source code fork shouldn't be confused with hard forks or soft forks.)
- Written in: C++
- Operating system: Windows, macOS, Linux
- Developer: Litecoin Core Development Team
- Source model: Open source
- License: MIT License

Ledger
- Ledger start: 7 October 2011 (15 years ago)
- Timestamping scheme: Proof-of-work
- Hash function: scrypt
- Issuance schedule: Block reward: initially 50, halved every 840,000 blocks
- Block reward: 6.25 (as of 2023)
- Block time: 2.5 minutes
- Supply limit: 84,000,000

Website
- Website: litecoin.org

Litecoin (abbreviation: LTC) is a cryptocurrency and open-source software project created by Charlie Lee and released in 2011. Its software was derived from Bitcoin's codebase. Litecoin uses a scrypt-based proof-of-work system, targets a block interval of 2.5 minutes, and has a maximum supply of 84 million litecoins.

== History ==
=== Pre-Litecoin ===
By 2011, bitcoin mining was largely performed by GPUs. This raised concern in some users that mining now had a high barrier to entry, and that CPU resources were becoming obsolete and worthless for mining. Using code from bitcoin, a new alternative currency was created called Tenebrix (TBX). Tenebrix replaced the SHA-256 rounds in bitcoin's mining algorithm with the scrypt function, which had been specifically designed in 2009 to be expensive to accelerate with FPGA or ASIC chips. This would allow Tenebrix to have been "GPU-resistant", and utilize the available CPU resources from bitcoin miners. Tenebrix itself was a successor project to an earlier cryptocurrency which replaced bitcoin's issuance schedule with a constant block reward (thus creating an unlimited money supply). However, the developers included a clause in the code that would allow them to claim 7.7 million TBX for themselves at no cost, which was criticized by users.

To address this, Charlie Lee, a Google employee who would later become engineering director at Coinbase, created an alternative version of Tenebrix called Fairbrix (FBX).

=== Creation and launch ===
Lee released Litecoin via an open-source client on GitHub on October 7, 2011.

=== 2011–2016 ===
After launch, the early growth of Litecoin was aided by its increasing exchange availability and liquidity on early exchanges such as BTC-e. During the month of November 2013, the aggregate value of Litecoin experienced massive growth which included a 100% leap within 24 hours.

In early 2014, Lee suggested merge mining (auxPOW) Dogecoin with Litecoin to the Dogecoin community at large. In September 2014, Dogecoin began merge-mining with Litecoin.

=== 2017–2021 ===
In 2020, PayPal added the ability for users to purchase a derivative of Litecoin along with bitcoin, Ethereum, and Bitcoin Cash which could not be withdrawn or spent as part of its Crypto feature.

In September 2021, a fake press release was published on GlobeNewswire announcing a partnership between Litecoin and Walmart. This caused the price of Litecoin to increase by around 30%, before the press release was revealed as a hoax.

=== 2022–present ===
In May 2022, MWEB (Mimblewimble Extension Blocks) upgrade was activated on the Litecoin network as a soft fork. This upgrade provides users with the option of sending confidential Litecoin transactions, in which the amount being sent is only known between the sender and receiver.

== Differences from bitcoin ==
Litecoin is different in some ways from bitcoin:

- The targeted block time is every 2.5 minutes for Litecoin, as opposed to bitcoin's 10 minutes. This allows Litecoin to confirm transactions four times faster than bitcoin.
- Scrypt, an alternative proof-of-work algorithm, is used for Litecoin. According to Motherboard, "Scrypt was chosen because it theoretically prevents the use of ASICs, those specialized chips that greatly increase mining power and efficiency (though there is debate over the validity of this claim).".
- Litecoin is merge mined with another prominent cryptocurrency, Dogecoin.
- MWEB optional privacy was added to Litecoin's base layer in May 2022 via soft fork.

Third-party vendors providing point of sale infrastructure for Litecoin include BitPay.

== See also ==
- List of scrypt crypto currencies
