= Simon Thompson (professor) =

Research computer scientist

- Education: D.Phil., University of Oxford, 1984
- Known for: Functional programming research, Cardano domain-specific languages: Marlowe
- Scientific career
- Fields: Computer science
- Institutions: University of Kent; Input Output Global
- Thesis: Recursion theories on the continuous functionals (1984)
- Doctoral advisor: Robin Oliver Gandy

Simon Thompson is a research computer scientist, author, and an emeritus professor of the University of Kent, specializing in logic and computation. His research into functional programming covers software verification and validation, programming tool-building, and software testing for the functional programming languages Erlang, Haskell, and OCaml. He is the author of books on data type theory, Miranda, Haskell, and Erlang, and runs a massive open online course about Erlang for FutureLearn.

== Education ==
Thompson earned a Doctor of Philosophy (D.Phil.) from the University of Oxford in 1984 with a dissertation titled "Recursion theories on the continuous functionals". Thompson's doctoral adviser was Robin Oliver Gandy.

== Work ==
As of 2025, he worked for Input Output Global, Input Output Hong Kong on domain-specific languages for the Cardano blockchain platform. There, he developed a specialised smart contract language, Marlowe, designed for non-programmers working in the financial sector. His most recent articles have been related to Core Erlang.

== Books ==
His books include:

- Thompson, Simon (January 1991 – March 1999). Type Theory and Functional Programming. International Computer Science Series. Addison-Wesley; Computing Laboratory, University of Kent. ISBN 979-8482847145.
- Thompson, Simon (21 July 1995). Miranda: The Craft of Functional Programming. International Computer Science Series. Addison-Wesley. ISBN 978-0201422795.
- Thompson, Simon (1996–2011). Haskell: The Craft of Functional Programming. International Computer Science Series (3rd ed.). Addison-Wesley, Cambridge University Press. ISBN 978-0201882957.
- Cesarini, Francesco; Thompson, Simon (28 July 2009). Erlang Programming: A Concurrent Approach to Software Development. O'Reilly Media. ISBN 978-0596518189. Quotes, Francesco Cesarini, founder: Erlang Solutions Ltd.
