= Vertcoin =

Cryptocurrency

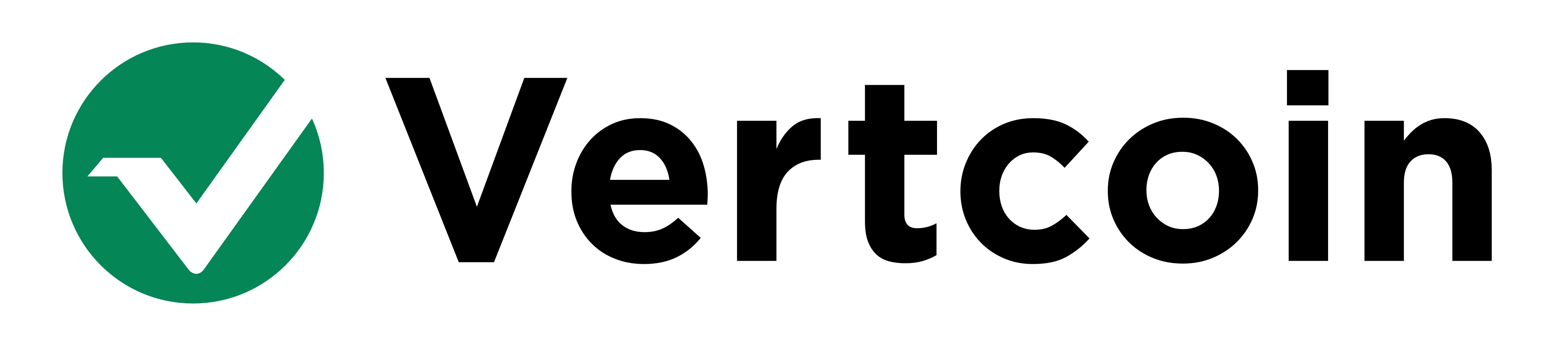

Denominations
- Plural: Vertcoin, Vertcoins
- Code: VTC (Note: Compatible with ISO 4217.)
- Precision: 10^{−8}
- Subunits
- 1/1000: millivertcoin

Development
- Implementation: Vertcoin Core
- Initial release: 8 January 2014 (12 years ago)
- Latest release: 23.2 / 2 October 2023 (2 years ago)
- Code repository: github.com/vertcoin-project/vertcoin-core
- Development status: Active
- Operating system: Windows, Linux, macOS
- Source model: Free and open-source software
- License: MIT License

Ledger
- Ledger start: 9 January 2014 (12 years ago)
- Timestamping scheme: Proof-of-work
- Hash function: Verthash
- Block reward: 12.5 (Note: January 2014 to approximately December 2021, halved approximately every four years)
- Block time: 2 minutes, 30 seconds
- Circulating supply: 68,972,398 (as of 19 March 2024)
- Supply limit: 84,000,000

Valuation
- Exchange rate: Floating

Demographics
- Official user: Worldwide

Website
- Website: vertcoin.org

Vertcoin (Abbreviation: VTC) is an open-source cryptocurrency created in early 2014, that focuses on decentralization. Vertcoin uses a proof-of-work mechanism to issue new coins and incentivize miners to secure the network and validate transactions. Vertcoin is designed to be mined via graphics cards instead of through ASICs.

== History ==
Vertcoin aims to be decentralized by being difficult to mine using dedicated processors, known as ASICs. Vertcoin is open source and has a 2.5-minute block time.

NBC News's Ben Popken said in 2018 that Vertcoin had received significant attention on Reddit due to it being impervious to ASICs which are used to mine bitcoin. TechRadar's Jonas DeMuro wrote in February 2018 that Vertcoin was comparatively popular due to a lack of friction for new users, as well as an active social media presence.

From October through December 2018, Vertcoin suffered from 51% attacks. In response, Vertcoin changed to a different proof-of-work algorithm before suffering from another 51% attack on December 1, 2019.

A December 2018 paper published in The Transactions of the Korean Institute of Electrical Engineers said that "because [Vertcoin] is not a very popular blockchain, the difficulty adjustment algorithm is very sensitive to hash rate change, making it an easy target to timestamp spoofing and cherry-picking attack."
