= Computer Communications Network =

Company

Computer Communications Network (CCN) was a company in Nashville, Tennessee. CCN had a branch in Torrance California.
