= KodakCoin =

Discontinued cryptocurrency for photography copyrights

KODAKCoin
Development
- Development status: Initial coin offering

Website
- Website: www.kodakone.com

KodakCoin (stylized KODAKCoin) was a Kodak-branded blockchain cryptocurrency, used to plan payments for licensed photographers. It was also able to generate individualized cryptocurrency for its users through Kodak KashMiner, a Bitcoin-mining computer. Critics characterized Kodak's association with the cryptocurrency as a "desperate money grab."

The initial coin offering (ICO) was initially scheduled for January 31, 2018, but was indefinitely delayed due to questions about its vetting process. A simple agreement for future tokens (SAFT) was then scheduled for May 2018, which limited purchases to accredited investors. The cryptocurrency was being developed under a brand licensee agreement between Kodak and RYDE Holding Inc., with the relationship and project ultimately canceled.

The project has been shut down, with all mentions of the KodakCoin and KodakOne removed from Kodak's official website.

== History ==
KodakCoin SAFTs were made available on May 21, 2018, to accredited investors in the United States, United Kingdom, and some other countries. Working in conjunction with the KodakOne digital rights management platform, KodakCoin was intended to serve as the currency for an encrypted ledger of intellectual property rights ownership. KodakCoin would have used the Ethereum blockchain platform.

KodakCoin was created by WENN Digital, using the Kodak trademark under license. KodakCoin was possibly a rebranding of an abandoned initial coin offering (ICO) known as RYDE, a cryptocurrency also developed by WENN Digital. WENN Digital is a company formed by investments from Wenn Media Group and Ryde GmbH, a German company.

=== KodakOne ===
KodakCoin was designed to work with Kodak's KodakOne platform, to facilitate image licensing for photographers. The KodakOne platform uses web crawlers to identify intellectual property licensed to the KodakOne platform, with payments for licensed photographs to be made using KodakCoin cryptocurrency.

The website and project has been shutdown, with all mention of the KodakCoin and KodakOne removed from Kodak's website.

== Reception ==
Following the January 9 announcement of the new platform at the 2018 CES in Las Vegas, Kodak's stock price tripled in two days, as its market valuation increased to US$565 million, an increase of more than 300 percent. By the end of January, one third of Kodak's shares were trading short.

BBC News' "Tech Tent" declared KodakCoin/KodakOne and the (unrelated) Kodak KashMiner as one of the "Worst Ideas" at CES 2018.
