= Rajeev Rastogi =

Indian computer scientist (born 1967)

- Born: 6 August 1967 (age 59); Mumbai, India
- Education: Indian Institute of Technology Bombay; University of Texas
- Scientific career
- Fields: Computer science
- Workplaces: Bell Labs; Yahoo Labs; Amazon (company)

Rajeev Ramnarain Rastogi is an Indian computer scientist who graduated from the Indian Institute of Technology Bombay, where he got his Bachelor of Science degree in 1988. He received his Master's and Doctoral degrees from the University of Texas in 1990, and 1993 respectively. Rastogi was born on 6 August 1967.

In 1993, Rastogi started working at Bell Labs in Murray Hill, New Jersey. He became member of technical staff at its Information Sciences Research Center. Five years later he held the Distinguished Member of Technical Staff position and by 1999 became a director of the Internet Management Research Department and became a Bell Labs fellow in 2003. In 2012, he became a fellow of the Association for Computing Machinery "for contributions to the analysis and management of large data sets."

He was vice president of Yahoo Labs in Bangalore and is currently serving as vice president of Machine Learning on Amazon. He has over 200 peer-reviewed articles with the CURE: An Efficient Clustering Algorithm for Large Databases which received over 3,100 citations since 1998, bringing him an h-index of 63.
