= Sonny King (artist) =

- Born: 1940 (age 85–86); Sydney, Australia
- Occupation: Artist/Designer
- Spouses: Sarah Jane Phillips (divorced 1993); Katherine Reback (married 1994)

Sonny King (born 1940) is an Australian artist. He was nominated for a sports Emmy in 1982. King is the son of former circus owner Mervyn King, which was the impetus behind his exhibition "The Original Silver's Circus & Zoo".
