= PlusToken =

Crypto-based Ponzi scheme

PlusToken was a Ponzi scheme that operated worldwide, but mainly had investors in China and South Korea.

== History ==
PlusToken started in April 2018. It offered monthly payments to users of its cryptocurrency wallet. There was also a token called Plus associated with it. The total amount of cryptocurrency taken by PlusToken was estimated to be worth (based on 2019 prices) between $2 and US$2.9 billion. The selling of cryptocurrencies from PlusToken was speculated to have been the cause of price drops in bitcoin.

In June 2019, six Chinese nationals associated with the scheme were arrested in Vanuatu and deported so they could face trial in China.

In July 2020, China's Ministry of Public Security announced that 27 "major criminal suspects" and 82 "key" members of PlusToken have been arrested.

In November 2020, a court in Jiangsu sentenced ringleaders behind the scheme to between two and eleven years in prison.

== See also ==
- Bitconnect
- OneCoin
- USI Tech
