= OneCoin =

Fraudulent cryptocurrency scheme

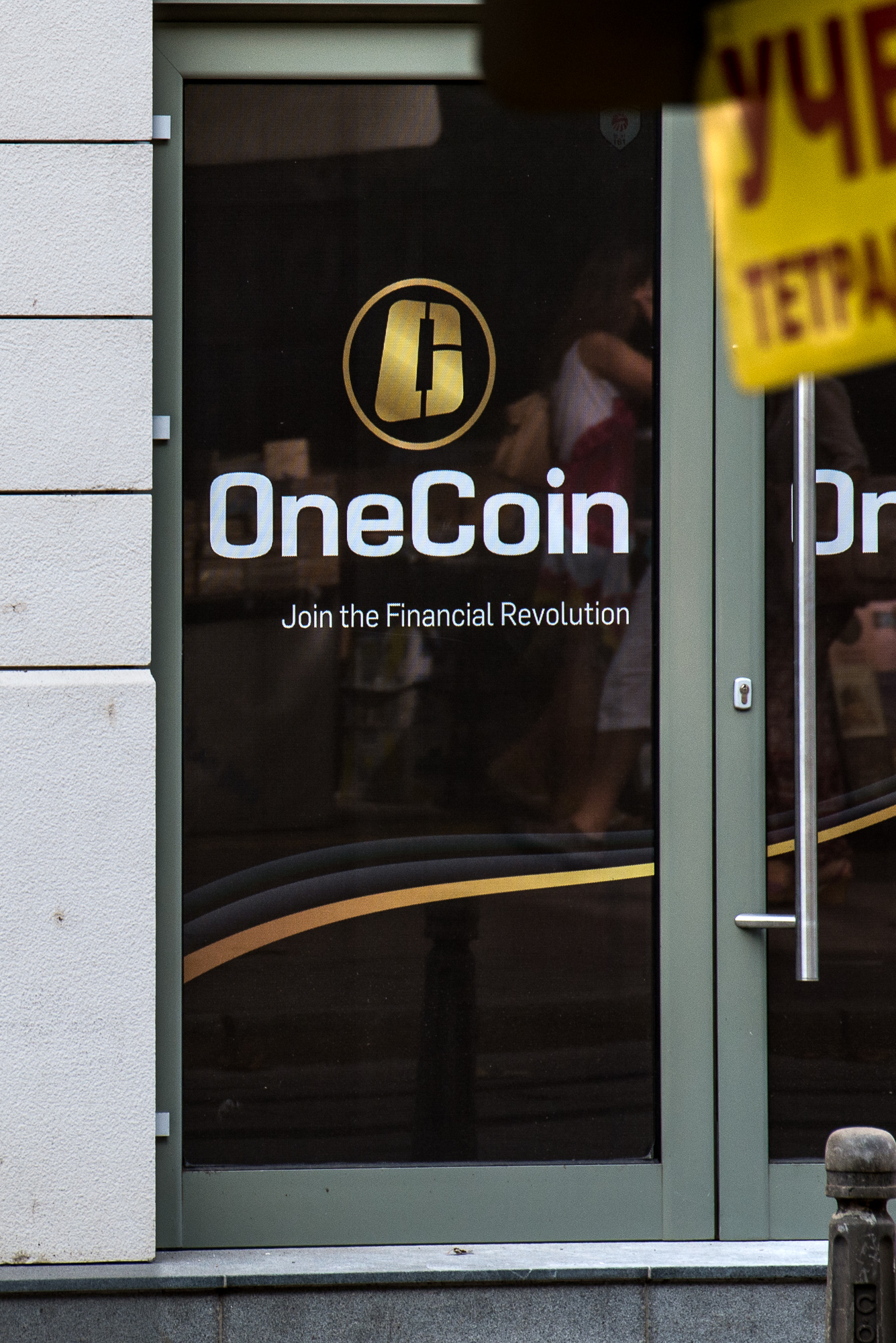
OneCoin's office's front door, in Sofia, Bulgaria, in 2016

OneCoin is a fraudulent cryptocurrency scheme conducted by offshore companies OneCoin Ltd (based in Bulgaria and registered in UAE) and OneLife Network Ltd (registered in Belize), both founded by Ruja Ignatova in concert with Sebastian Greenwood. OneCoin is considered a Ponzi scheme due to its organisational structure of paying early investors using money obtained from newer ones. It was also a pyramid scheme due to the recruiting of investors without providing any actual product. The company maintained its own database of coins rather than using a blockchain and had no mining process which limited its ability to release and circulate coins. Many of the people central to OneCoin had been previously involved in similar schemes and business malpractice. OneCoin was described by The Times as "one of the biggest scams in history".

US prosecutors alleged the scheme brought in approximately $4 billion worldwide. In China, law enforcement recovered 1.7 billion yuan (US$267.5 million) while prosecuting 98 people. Ruja Ignatova disappeared in 2017 when a secret US warrant was filed for her arrest, and her brother, Konstantin Ignatov, took her position at the company. Most of the leaders of the company disappeared or were arrested, though Ruja Ignatova has escaped arrest. Greenwood was arrested in 2018, as was Konstantin Ignatov in March 2019. In November 2019, Konstantin Ignatov pleaded guilty to charges of money laundering and fraud. The total maximum sentence for the charges is 90 years in prison. In 2022 Greenwood pleaded guilty, and in 2023 was sentenced to 20 years for wire fraud and money laundering.

== Concept ==
An episode of the FBI's series "Inside the FBI" about Ruja Ignatova and how she allegedly robbed investors of billions of dollars

OneCoin was launched in late 2014. It was not a decentralized cryptocurrency but rather a centralized pyramid scheme hosted on OneCoin Ltd's servers which was marketed as a cryptocurrency. The scheme was set up by Ruja Ignatova with Sebastian Greenwood acting as the lead distributor in the pyramid.

According to OneCoin, its main business was selling educational material for cryptocurrency trading: investors could buy "educational packages" costing anywhere from 100 euros to 118,000 euros, or—according to one industry blog—225,500 euros. According to a suit filed by former investors, much of the content in those packages was plagiarized from various free sources, including Wikipedia. Investors also received "tokens" that could supposedly be assigned to mine OneCoins, although no actual mining process existed. Mining was said to be taking place at two sites in Bulgaria and one in Hong Kong.

In typical OneCoin recruiting meetings, recruiters would focus on cryptocurrency investment, and the "educational material" was barely mentioned.

The only way to exchange OneCoins for other currencies was the OneCoin Exchange ("xcoinx"), an internal marketplace for members who had invested more than a set amount. OneCoins could be exchanged for euros, which were placed in a "virtual wallet", from which they could request a wire transfer. The marketplace had daily selling limits based on which package the seller had invested in, greatly limiting the amount of OneCoins which could be exchanged by the scam's victims. As lead distributor, 5% of all OneCoin sales went to Greenwood, who made over US$300 million.

On 1 March 2016, without notice, OneCoin issued an internal notice that the marketplace would be closed for two weeks for maintenance, explaining that this was necessary due to the "high number of miners" and for "better integration with blockchain". On 15 March 2016, the market re-opened. It was shut down again without notice in January 2017, though individuals affiliated with the company continued to accept funds.

Following the collapse of the OneCoin scheme, a rebranded venture called One Ecosystem emerged, presenting itself as a separate educational company despite maintaining ties to the original community and coin.

== Legal issues and criticism ==
=== 2015 ===
On 30 September 2015, Bulgaria's Financial Supervision Commission (FSC) issued a warning of potential risks in new cryptocurrencies, citing OneCoin as an example. After the warning, OneCoin ceased all activity in Bulgaria and started to use banks in foreign countries to handle wire transfers from participants.

=== 2016 ===
In February 2016, the British newspaper the Daily Mirror wrote that OneCoin / OneLife is a get-rich-quick scheme scam and a cult, calling it "virtually worthless".

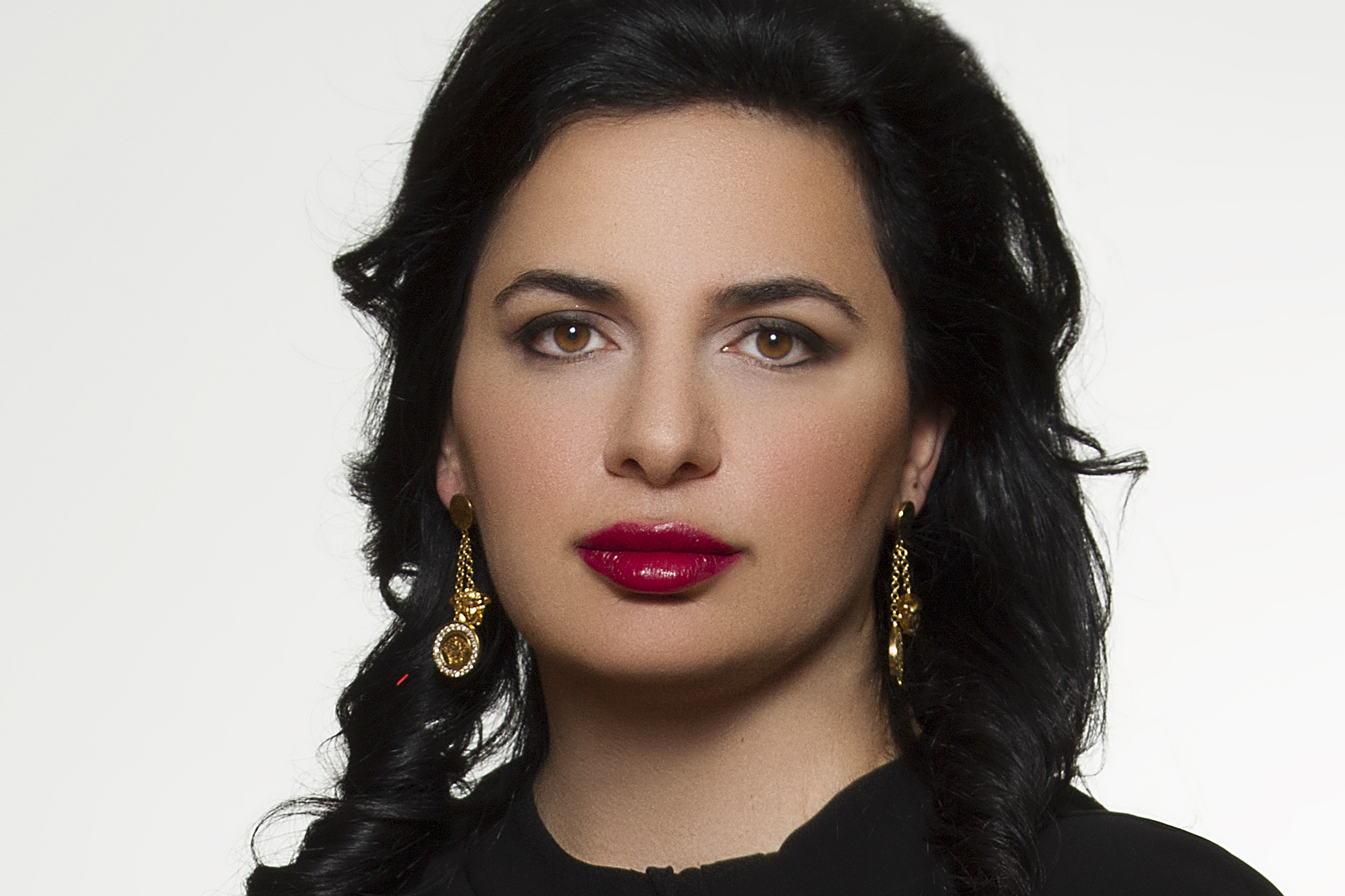
Ruja Ignatova, CEO of OneCoin

The company and the scheme was on the observation lists of many authorities; among them are authorities in Bulgaria, Finland, Sweden, Norway and Latvia. Authorities in many countries warned of potential risks involved in businesses like OneCoin and undertook prosecutions against persons linked to OneCoin, including CEO Ruja Ignatova and her brother Konstantin Ignatov.

In March 2016, the Direct Selling Association in Norway warned against OneCoin, comparing it to a pyramid scheme.

In December 2016, the Italian Antitrust Authority (Autorità Garante della Concorrenza e del Mercato) "adopted an interim injunction against the company One Network Services Ltd., active in the promotion and dissemination of cryptocurrency OneCoin", and its representatives in Italy, describing their activities as an "illegal pyramid sales system" ("sistema di vendita piramidale vietato dalla legge"), and ordering them to cease promoting and selling OneCoin in Italy. On 27 February 2017, after concluding their investigation, AGCM banned all activity on OneCoin until further notice.

In December 2016, the Hungarian Central Bank issued a warning that OneCoin was a pyramid scheme, and in China that same year several members and investors of OneCoin were arrested and US$30.8 million worth of assets seized.

=== 2017 ===
In March 2017, the Croatian National Bank (HNB) advised the public to "exercise a high degree of caution" in decisions involving OneCoin, noted that OneCoin operations are not supervised by the HNB, and warned that possible losses will be fully borne by the investors.

On 23 April 2017, Indian police arrested 18 people in Navi Mumbai for organizing a OneCoin recruitment event. The police attended the event undercover to judge the accusations before they decided to act. Further investigation was begun with the intent of revealing the higher levels of the pyramid. In May, the investigation recovered Rs 24.57 crores ($3.32 million USD) in nine bank accounts. A further Rs 75 crores ($10.12 million USD) were transferred out before authorities were able to seize it. Early in the month of May, two more people were arrested and a further Rs 24 crores ($3.24 million USD) were seized from bank accounts. A special investigation team of 15 individuals including 4 assistant police inspectors was formed under Senior Police Inspector Shivaji Awate with the stated goal of following the money trail and possibly lead to further arrests.

On 27 April 2017, Germany's Federal Financial Supervisory Authority (BaFin) issued cease and desist orders to Onecoin Ltd, Dubai, and OneLife Network Ltd, Belize. The Authority concluded that trading in OneCoins was fraudulent "own funds" trading.

On 28 April 2017, Bank of Thailand issued a warning against OneCoin, stating it was an illegal digital currency and that it should not be used in trade.

On 29 May 2017, International Financial Services Commission of Belize (IFSC) issued a warning about OneLife Network Ltd conducting trading business without license or permission from IFSC or any other authority. OneLife Network Ltd was directed to cease and desist from carrying on with the illegal trading business.

On 16 June 2017, the CEO of OneCoin Ltd. claimed OneCoin was licensed by the Vietnamese government, that it was legally permissible to use them as a digital currency and that it was the first cryptocurrency in Asia officially licensed by any government. On 20 June 2017, Vietnam's Ministry of Planning and Investment (MPI) issued a statement that the document which OneCoin used as proof was forged. They stated that the document was against the MPI regulations and that the person who supposedly signed the document was not in the position claimed by the document at the time when the document was created. MPI warned individuals and enterprises to be vigilant if they encounter the document during business.

On 10 July 2017, Ruja Ignatova, the CEO, was charged in India with duping investors as a part of the Indian investigation.

=== 2018 ===
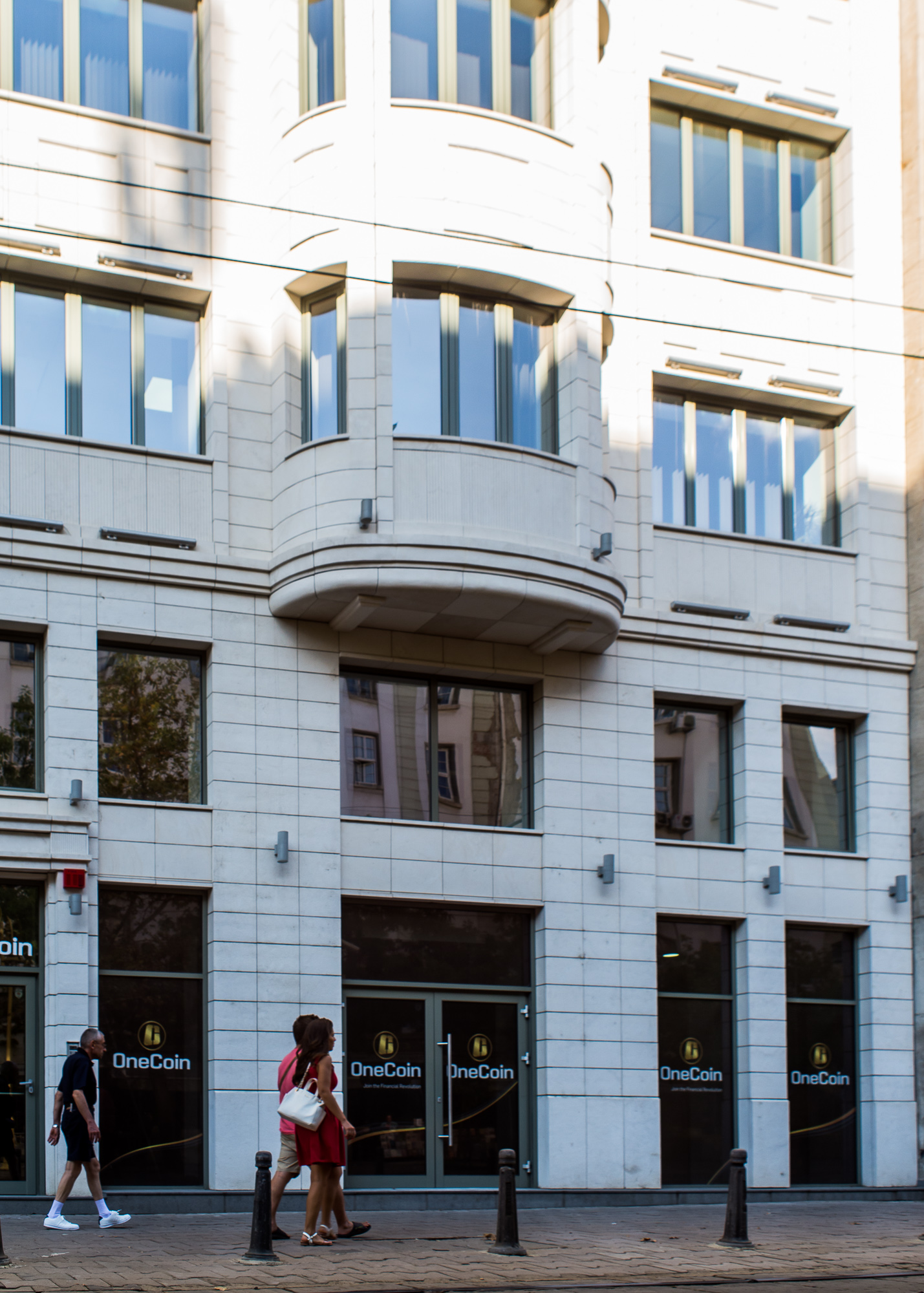
The office of OneCoin in Sofia, Bulgaria, in 2016

On 17 and 18 January 2018, Bulgarian police raided OneCoin's office in Sofia at the request of the prosecutor's office in Bielefeld, Germany. German police and Europol took part in the bust and the investigation. Also 14 other companies, tied to OneCoin, were investigated and 50 witnesses were questioned. OneCoin's servers and other material evidence were seized.

On 3 May 2018, the Central Bank of Samoa (CBS) banned all foreign exchange transactions related to OneCoin and OneLife. The bank had earlier in March issued a warning about OneCoin. CBS describes OneCoin as a very-high-risk pyramid scheme.

Ruja Ignatova's collaborator and OneCoin's co-founder Sebastian Karl Greenwood (age 49–50) was arrested in Thailand in July 2018. He was imprisoned in Thailand pending extradition to the United States. Greenwood is a father of four and a citizen of Sweden and the UK. Greenwood used money from Onecoin to buy international real estate, expensive clothing and watches, and to make a kr 6,500,000 down-payment on a Sunseeker yacht.

=== 2019 ===
Ruja Ignatova's brother Konstantin Ignatov was arrested in March 2019. In a plea deal made on 4 October (made public 12 November), he pleaded guilty to fraud and money laundering in connection with the scheme.

On 21 November 2019 the New York Federal Court found lawyer Mark Scott guilty of money laundering and bank fraud for his role in routing US$400m out of the US.

On 24 November 2019 the BBC published a detailed investigation of OneCoin and Ignatova titled "Cryptoqueen: How this woman scammed the world, then vanished". The reporters believe that Ignatova resides in Frankfurt under a false identity.

=== 2020 ===
In 2020 the FinCEN Files showed that BNY Mellon flagged to FinCEN $137m of transactions related to OneCoin.

=== 2021 ===
The company OneCoin, Ruja Ignatova and Gilbert Armenta have been found in default at an ongoing trial in the US.

=== 2022 ===
In May 2022, Europol added Ignatova to their "Europe's Most Wanted" list, offering a €5,000 reward for information leading to her arrest. On June 30, the Federal Bureau of Investigation added Ignatova to the FBI Ten Most Wanted Fugitives list, offering a reward of up to $100,000 for information leading to her arrest.

In December, Greenwood pleaded guilty to wire fraud and money laundering in the a US federal court.

=== 2023 ===
In March 2023, OneCoin's former legal and compliance officer Irina Dilkinska was caught and extradited from Bulgaria to the United States.

Frank Schneider, former intelligence officer of Luxembourg and advisor to Ignatova, has absconded. Journalists speculate that Ignatova might have been murdered.

In September 2023, Greenwood was sentenced to a 20-year federal prison term (with five years credit for time served) by a New York Federal court.

=== 2024 ===
Dilkinska admitted her guilt and was sentenced to four years in prison.

The Prosecutor General of Bulgaria has initiated proceedings to confiscate all Ignatova's properties in Bulgaria. US authorities offer a five million dollar reward for information leading to the arrest and/or conviction of Ignatova.

== See also ==
- Bitconnect
- PlusToken
- USI Tech
