= Cunningham chain =

Type of sequence of prime numbers

In mathematics, a Cunningham chain is a certain sequence of prime numbers. Cunningham chains are named after mathematician A. J. C. Cunningham. They are also called chains of nearly doubled primes.

== Definition ==
A Cunningham chain of the first kind of length n is a sequence of prime numbers (p_{1}, ..., p_{n}) such that p_{i+1} = 2p_{i} + 1 for all 1 ≤ i < n. (Hence each term of such a chain except the last is a Sophie Germain prime, and each term except the first is a safe prime).

It follows that

$$\begin{align}
p_2 & = 2p_1+1, \\
p_3 & = 4p_1+3, \\
p_4 & = 8p_1+7, \\
& {}\  \vdots \\
p_i & = 2^{i-1}p_1 + (2^{i-1}-1),
\end{align}$$

or, by setting $a = \frac{p_1 + 1}{2}$ (the number $a$ is not part of the sequence and need not be a prime number), we have $p_i = 2^{i} a - 1.$

Similarly, a Cunningham chain of the second kind of length n is a sequence of prime numbers (p_{1}, ..., p_{n}) such that p_{i+1} = 2p_{i} − 1 for all 1 ≤ i < n.

It follows that the general term is

$$p_i = 2^{i-1}p_1 - (2^{i-1}-1).$$

Now, by setting $a = \frac{p_1 - 1}{2}$, we have $p_i = 2^{i} a + 1$.

Cunningham chains are also sometimes generalized to sequences of prime numbers (p_{1}, ..., p_{n}) such that p_{i+1} = ap_{i} + b for all 1 ≤ i ≤ n for fixed coprime integers a and b; the resulting chains are called generalized Cunningham chains.

A Cunningham chain is called complete if it cannot be further extended, i.e., if the previous and the next terms in the chain are not prime numbers.

== Examples ==
Examples of complete Cunningham chains of the first kind include these:

2, 5, 11, 23, 47 (The next number would be 95, but that is not prime.)
3, 7 (The next number would be 15, but that is not prime.)
29, 59 (The next number would be 119, but that is not prime.)
41, 83, 167 (The next number would be 335, but that is not prime.)
89, 179, 359, 719, 1439, 2879 (The next number would be 5759, but that is not prime.)

Examples of complete Cunningham chains of the second kind include these:

2, 3, 5 (The next number would be 9, but that is not prime.)
7, 13 (The next number would be 25, but that is not prime.)
19, 37, 73 (The next number would be 145, but that is not prime.)
31, 61 (The next number would be 121 = 11^{2}, but that is not prime.)

Cunningham chains are now considered useful in cryptographic systems since "they provide two concurrent suitable settings for the ElGamal cryptosystem ... [which] can be implemented in any field where the discrete logarithm problem is difficult."

== Largest known Cunningham chains ==
It follows from Dickson's conjecture and the broader Schinzel's hypothesis H, both widely believed to be true, that for every k there are infinitely many Cunningham chains of length k. There are, however, no known direct methods of generating such chains.

There are computing competitions for the longest Cunningham chain or for the one built up of the largest primes, but unlike the breakthrough of Ben J. Green and Terence Tao – the Green–Tao theorem, that there are arithmetic progressions of primes of arbitrary length – there is no general result known on large Cunningham chains to date.

Largest known Cunningham chain of length k (as of 28 October 2026)
k	Kind	p_{1} (starting prime)	Digits	Year	Discoverer
1	1st / 2nd	2^{136279841} − 1	41024320	2024	Luke Durant, GIMPS
2	1st	2618163402417×2^{1290000} − 1	388342	2016	PrimeGrid
2	2nd	213778324725×2^{561417} + 1	169015	2023	Ryan Propper & Serge Batalov
3	1st	1128330746865×2^{66439} − 1	20013	2020	Michael Paridon
3	2nd	214923707595×2^{49073} + 1	14784	2025	Serge Batalov
4	1st	93003628384×10111# − 1	4362	2025	Serge Batalov
4	2nd	162229493368×11171# + 1	4809	2026	Serge Batalov
5	1st	545307414728×4801# − 1	2065	2026	Serge Batalov
5	2nd	991498713083×4813# + 1	2069	2026	Serge Batalov
6	1st	2799873605326×2371# − 1	1016	2015	Serge Batalov
6	2nd	37015322207094×2339# + 1	1001	2025	Serge Batalov
7	1st	190721977563410×1201# − 1	518	2026	Serge Batalov
7	2nd	11696328195950×1201# + 1	517	2026	Serge Batalov
8	1st	644400141144287×787# − 1	342	2026	Serge Batalov
8	2nd	129881996750510×787# + 1	341	2026	Serge Batalov
9	1st	553374939996823808×593# − 1	260	2016	Andrey Balyakin
9	2nd	64940998375255×787# + 1	341	2026	Serge Batalov
10	1st	2498880093962929×349# − 1	156	2026	Serge Batalov
10	2nd	259549635108226×347# + 1	153	2026	Serge Batalov
11	1st	73853903764168979088206401473739410396455001112581722569026969860983656346568919×151# − 1	140	2013	Primecoin (block 95569)
11	2nd	341841671431409652891648×311# + 1	149	2016	Andrey Balyakin
12	1st	288320466650346626888267818984974462085357412586437032687304004479168536445314040×83# − 1	113	2014	Primecoin (block 558800)
12	2nd	906644189971753846618980352×233# + 1	121	2015	Andrey Balyakin
13	1st	106680560818292299253267832484567360951928953599522278361651385665522443588804123392×61# − 1	107	2014	Primecoin (block 368051)
13	2nd	38249410745534076442242419351233801191635692835712219264661912943040353398995076864×47# + 1	101	2014	Primecoin (block 539977)
14	1st	4631673892190914134588763508558377441004250662630975370524984655678678526944768×47# − 1	97	2018	Primecoin (block 2659167)
14	2nd	5819411283298069803200936040662511327268486153212216998535044251830806354124236416×47# + 1	100	2014	Primecoin (block 547276)
15	1st	14354792166345299956567113728×43# - 1	45	2016	Andrey Balyakin
15	2nd	1932144234211304994×71# / 31 + 1	44	2026	Serge Batalov
16	1st	5201553456122611142×41# / 31 − 1	32	2026	Serge Batalov
16	2nd	109114927349041124×41# / 31 + 1	31	2026	Serge Batalov
17	1st	2600776728061305571×41# / 31 − 1	32	2026	Serge Batalov
17	2nd	1540797425367761006138858881	28	2014	Chermoni & Wroblewski
18	1st	214325014495971624590189129	27	2026	Nenad Mićić
18	2nd	658189097608811942204322721	27	2014	Chermoni & Wroblewski
19	1st	27692774713034525184617669	26	2026	Chermoni & Wroblewski
19	2nd	79910197721667870187016101	26	2014	Chermoni & Wroblewski
20	1st	75949683268775452969189499	26	2026	John Armitage
20	2nd	3352894966466100254851081	25	2026	John Armitage

q# denotes the primorial 2 × 3 × 5 × 7 × ... × q.

As of October 2026, the longest known Cunningham chain of either kind is of length 20, discovered by John Armitage in 2026.

== Congruences of Cunningham chains ==
Let the odd prime $p_1$ be the first prime of a Cunningham chain of the first kind. The first prime is odd, thus $p_1 \equiv 1 \pmod{2}$. Since each successive prime in the chain is $p_{i+1} = 2p_i + 1$ it follows that $p_i \equiv 2^i - 1 \pmod{2^i}$. Thus, $p_2 \equiv 3 \pmod{4}$, $p_3 \equiv 7 \pmod{8}$, and so forth.

The above property can be informally observed by considering the primes of a chain in base 2. (Note that, as with all bases, multiplying by the base "shifts" the digits to the left; e.g. in decimal we have 314 × 10 = 3140.) When we consider $p_{i+1} = 2p_i + 1$ in base 2, we see that, by multiplying $p_i$ by 2, the least significant digit of $p_i$ becomes the secondmost least significant digit of $p_{i+1}$. Because $p_i$ is odd—that is, the least significant digit is 1 in base 2–we know that the secondmost least significant digit of $p_{i+1}$ is also 1. And, finally, we can see that $p_{i+1}$ will be odd due to the addition of 1 to $2p_i$. In this way, successive primes in a Cunningham chain are essentially shifted left in binary with ones filling in the least significant digits. For example, here is a complete length 6 chain which starts at 141361469:

Binary	Decimal
1000011011010000000100111101	141361469
10000110110100000001001111011	282722939
100001101101000000010011110111	565445879
1000011011010000000100111101111	1130891759
10000110110100000001001111011111	2261783519
100001101101000000010011110111111	4523567039

A similar result holds for Cunningham chains of the second kind. From the observation that $p_1 \equiv 1 \pmod{2}$ and the relation $p_{i+1} = 2 p_i - 1$ it follows that $p_i \equiv 1 \pmod{2^i}$. In binary notation, the primes in a Cunningham chain of the second kind end with a pattern "0...01", where, for each $i$, the number of zeros in the pattern for $p_{i+1}$ is one more than the number of zeros for $p_i$. As with Cunningham chains of the first kind, the bits left of the pattern shift left by one position with each successive prime.

Similarly, because $p_i = 2^{i-1}p_1 + (2^{i-1}-1) \,$ it follows that $p_i \equiv 2^{i-1} - 1 \pmod{p_1}$. But, by Fermat's little theorem, $2^{p_1-1} \equiv 1 \pmod{p_1}$, so $p_1$ divides $p_{p_1}$ (i.e. with $i = p_1$). Thus, no Cunningham chain can be of infinite length.

== See also ==
- Primecoin, which uses Cunningham chains as a proof-of-work system
- Bi-twin chain
- Primes in arithmetic progression
