= Bi-twin chain =

In number theory, a bi-twin chain of length k + 1 is a sequence of natural numbers

$$n-1,n+1,2n-1,2n+1, \dots, 2^k n - 1, 2^k n + 1 \,$$

in which every number is prime.

The special case, when the four numbers $n-1,n+1,2n-1,2n+1$ are all primes, they are called bi-twin primes, such n values are

6, 30, 660, 810, 2130, 2550, 3330, 3390, 5850, 6270, 10530, 33180, 41610, 44130, 53550, 55440, 57330, 63840, 65100, 70380, 70980, 72270, 74100, 74760, 78780, 80670, 81930, 87540, 93240, … (sequence A066388 in the OEIS)

Except 6, all of these numbers are divisible by 30.

The numbers $n-1, 2n-1, \dots, 2^kn - 1$ form a Cunningham chain of the first kind of length $k + 1$, while $n+1, 2n + 1, \dots, 2^kn + 1$ forms a Cunningham chain of the second kind. Each of the pairs $2^in - 1, 2^in+ 1$ is a pair of twin primes. Each of the primes $2^in - 1$ for $0 \le i \le k - 1$ is a Sophie Germain prime and each of the primes $2^in - 1$ for $1 \le i \le k$ is a safe prime.

== Largest known bi-twin chains ==
Largest known bi-twin chains of length k + 1 (as of 22 January 2025)
k	n	Digits	Year	Discoverer
0	2996863034895×2^{1290000}	388342	2016	Timothy D. Winslow, PrimeGrid
1	117864619517*6907#	2971	2017	Dirk Augustin
2	1329861957×937#×2^{3}	399	2006	Dirk Augustin
3	223818083×409#×2^{6}	177	2006	Dirk Augustin
4	657713606161972650207961798852923689759436009073516446064261314615375779503143112×149#	138	2014	Primecoin (block 479357)
5	386727562407905441323542867468313504832835283009085268004408453725770596763660073×61#×2^{45}	118	2014	Primecoin (block 476538)
6	263840027547344796978150255669961451691187241066024387240377964639380278103523328×47#	99	2015	Primecoin (block 942208)
7	10739718035045524715×13#	24	2008	Jaroslaw Wroblewski
8	1873321386459914635×13#×2	24	2008	Jaroslaw Wroblewski

q# denotes the primorial 2×3×5×7×...×q.

As of 2014, the longest known bi-twin chain is of length 8.

== Relation with other properties ==
=== Related chains ===
- Cunningham chain

=== Related properties of primes/pairs of primes ===
- Twin primes
- Sophie Germain prime is a prime $p$ such that $2p + 1$ is also prime.
- Safe prime is a prime $p$ such that $(p-1)/2$ is also prime.

== Notes and references ==
- As of this edit, this article uses content from "Bitwin chain", which is licensed in a way that permits reuse under the Creative Commons Attribution-ShareAlike 3.0 Unported License, but not under the GFDL. All relevant terms must be followed.
