= Titcoin =

Cryptocurrency launched in 2014

Titcoin Digital Currency
- Titcoin Brand Logo

Denominations
- Plural: Titcoins, TITs
- Nickname: TIT

Development
- Initial release: June 21, 2014; 12 years ago

Ledger
- Supply limit: 69,000,000 TIT

Demographics
- Official user: Worldwide

Administration
- Issuing authority: Decentralized Peer-to-Peer Netswork

Titcoin (Ticker Symbol: TIT) is a cryptocurrency launched in 2014. Titcoin's blockchain is derived from the Bitcoin source code, with modifications to improve transaction speed and efficiency. Titcoin is intended for the adult entertainment industry to allow users to pay for adult products and services without the fear of incriminating payment histories appearing on their credit cards.

In 2015, Titcoin received two nominations at the 2015 XBIZ Awards.

== History ==
Titcoin was founded by Edward Mansfield, Richard Allen, and a third anonymous individual. The founders developed Titcoin for the adult entertainment industry as a cash alternative payment system for performing anonymous transactions.

On June 21, 2014, the Titcoin cryptocurrency wallet and source code was released with an initial soft launch for the cryptocurrency community followed by a hard launch for the public.

In September 2014, Patrick McDonnell joined the Titcoin development team as a business development advisor.

On May 29, 2017, Titcoin and its properties were acquired by the adult game development studio Joy-Toilet.

On September 5, 2018, Titcoin and its assets were acquired by the TittieCoin Developers.
