= Peercoin =

Cryptocurrency

Denominations
- Plural: PPC, Peercoins
- Code: PPC
- Subunits
- 1/100: mPPC (millicoin)
- 1/1000000: μPPC (microcoin)

Development
- Original author(s): Scott Nadal, Sunny King (pseudonym)
- White paper: "Peercoin Documentation"
- Initial release: 12 August 2012, 17:57:38 UTC
- Latest release: 0.15.1 / 11 June 2025
- Code repository: github.com/peercoin/peercoin
- Development status: Active
- Source model: Open source
- License: MIT/X11

Ledger
- Ledger start: 12 August 2012, 18:00:00 UTC
- Timestamping scheme: Hybrid Proof-of-stake and Proof-of-work
- Hash function: SHA-256
- Block reward: Variable; depends on network difficulty
- Block time: 8.6 minutes
- Block explorer: https://chainz.cryptoid.info/ppc/
- Circulating supply: 30.5M PPC (15 October 2026)
- Supply limit: Unlimited

Valuation
- Exchange rate: US$0.49 (15 October 2026)

Website
- Website: www.peercoin.net

Peercoin, also known as Peer-to-Peer Coin, or PPC, is a cryptocurrency utilizing both proof-of-stake and proof-of-work systems. It is notable as the first cryptocurrency to implement the proof-of-stake consensus mechanism.

== History ==
Peercoin is based on an August 2012 paper that listed the authors as Scott Nadal and Sunny King. King, who also created Primecoin, is a pseudonym.

The Peercoin source code is distributed under the MIT/X11 software license.

== Economics ==
Peercoin uses both the proof-of-work and proof-of-stake algorithms. Both are used to spread the distribution of new coins. During its primary years, Peercoin relied heavily on PoW, although there has now been a transition to PoS. Proof-of-stake is used to secure the network: The chain with longest PoS coin age wins in case of a blockchain split-up.

To target a global 1% annual inflation rate, individual stakes typically receive a 3 - 5% annual reward, as only a minority of coins are actively staked. This reward is based on a dynamic portion (75% of the reward) and a static portion (25% of the reward). The dynamic portion of the reward for an individual stake is based on the number of coins, their unspent age, and degree of global staking participation. Stake-for-Stake, periods of low (high) global staking participation will result in a higher (lower) dynamic reward. The static portion of the reward is based on the fraction of the existing total coin supply minted on average in a year, and is awarded regardless of stake size. As of December 2024, the static reward for a proof-of-stake block is approximately 1.4 PPC.

A transaction fee prevents spam and is burned (instead of being collected by a miner), benefiting the overall network.
