= Charlie Lee (computer scientist) =

American computer scientist

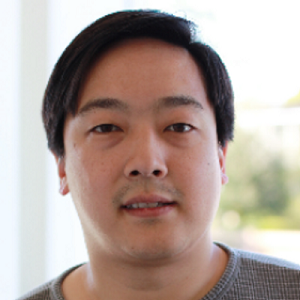
- Born: 1977; Ivory Coast
- Education: Massachusetts Institute of Technology

Charlie Lee (born 1977) is an American computer scientist, best known as the creator of Litecoin. He serves as the managing director of the Litecoin Foundation.

== Early life ==
Lee was born in Ivory Coast to ethnic Chinese parents who had moved there from China during the 1960s wave of economic openings following decolonization. He moved to the United States at the age of 13, and graduated from high school in 1995. He graduated from the Massachusetts Institute of Technology with bachelor's and master's degrees in computer science in 2000.

Lee's brother, Bobby C. Lee, is the founder and CEO of cryptocurrency exchange BTC China.

== Career ==
For a decade in the 2000s, Lee worked for Google. His work for the company included writing code for ChromeOS. In 2011, Lee became interested in Bitcoin. In October 2011, he released Litecoin on Bitcointalk. He had written the blockchain technology based on Bitcoin in his spare time while employed at Google. He released Litecoin to the public after mining only 150 coins. Lee has stated that he did not intend to compete with Bitcoin but meant Litecoin to be used for smaller transactions.

In July 2013, Lee left Google and began working at Coinbase, before the cryptocurrency exchange adopted the coin he had created. Lee held the position of engineering director until 2017.

In December 2017, Lee announced on Reddit that he sold almost all of his Litecoin holdings due to a perceived conflict of interest. He had been criticized for his tweets, which had a possible effect on the price of the coin. Lee sold or donated all of his coins except for a few minted in physical form, which he kept as collectibles.

Lee is currently working full-time with the Litecoin Foundation on fostering Litecoin adoption. In June 2025, it was announced that Lee had joined the advisory board of digital infrastructure and technology company Luxxfolio.
