= NEO (blockchain) =

Neo

Denominations
- Code: Neo, formerly ANS

Development
- Original author(s): Da Hongfei, Erik Zhang
- White paper: https://docs.neo.org/docs/en-us/basic/whitepaper.html
- Initial release: February 2014; 12 years ago as AntShares and rebranded as Neo in June 2017
- Code repository: NEO Github
- Written in: C#
- License: MIT

Ledger
- Block time: 15 seconds
- Block explorer: neotube.io dora.coz.io
- Circulating supply: 70,530,000
- Supply limit: 100,000,000

Website
- Website: neo.org

Neo is a blockchain-based cryptocurrency and application platform used to run smart contracts and decentralized applications. The project, originally named Antshares, was founded in 2014 by Da HongFei and Erik Zhang and rebranded as Neo in 2017. In 2017 and 2018, it became popular in China despite the recently enacted prohibition on cryptocurrency in that country.

== Specifications ==
The Neo network runs on a proof-of-stake decentralized Byzantine fault tolerant (dBFT) consensus mechanism between a number of centrally approved nodes, and can support up to 10,000 transactions per second. The base asset of the Neo blockchain is the non-divisible Neo token which generates GAS tokens. These GAS tokens, a separate asset on the network, can be used to pay for transaction fees, and are divisible with the smallest unit of 0.00000001. The inflation rate of GAS is controlled with a decaying half-life algorithm that is designed to release 100 million GAS over approximately 22 years.

X.509 Digital Identities allow developers to tie tokens to real-world identities which aid in complying with KYC/AML and other regulatory requirements.

== History ==
In 2014, Antshares was founded by Da Hongfei and Erik Zhang. In the following year, it was open-sourced on GitHub and by September 2015, the white paper was released.

A total of 100 million Neo were created in the genesis block. 50 million Neo were sold to early investors through an initial coin offering in 2016 that raised US 4.65 million, with the remaining 50 million Neo locked into a smart contract. Each year, a maximum of 15 million Neo tokens are unlocked which are used by the Neo development team to fund long-term development goals.

Neo was officially rebranded from Antshares in June 2017, with the idea of combining the past and the future.

Neo3 or N3 was first announced by Erik Zhang in 2018 as an upgrade to the previous Neo protocol (now known as Neo Legacy). Certain new features do not have backward compatibility with the Neo Legacy blockchain. N3 was implemented and launched with a new genesis block.

In March 2018, Neo's parent company Onchain distributed 1 Ontology token (ONT) for every 5 NEO held in a user's cryptocurrency wallet. These tokens were intended to be used to vote on system upgrades, identity verification mechanisms, and other governance issues on the Neo platform.
