= Primecoin =

Cryptocurrency based on prime numbers

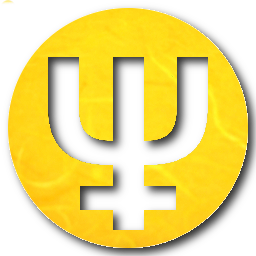
- Primecoin logo

Denominations
- Plural: Primecoin, primecoins
- Nickname: XPM
- Subunits
- 0.001: mXPM (millicoin)
- 0.000001: μXPM (microcoin)
- 0.00000001: Smallest unit

Demographics
- Official user: International

Administration
- Issuing authority: None, the primecoin peer-to-peer network regulates and distributes through consensus in protocol.
- Date of introduction: 7 July 2013
- Inflation_rate: Limited release, production rate before this limit re-evaluated with the production of every block (at a rate of approximately 1 block per minute) based on the difficulty with which primecoins are produced.

Primecoin (Abbreviation: XPM) is a cryptocurrency that implements a proof-of-work system that searches for chains of prime numbers.

Primecoin was launched in July 7, 2013 by Sunny King, who also founded Peercoin.

Unlike other cryptocurrencies, which are mined using algorithms that solved mathematical problems with no extrinsic value, mining Primecoin involves producing chains of prime numbers (Cunningham and bi-twin chains). These are useful to scientists and mathematicians and meet the requirements for a proof of work system of being hard to compute but easy to verify and having an adjustable difficulty.

Shortly after its launch, some trade journals reported that the rush of over 18,000 new users seeking to mine Primecoin overwhelmed providers of dedicated servers. It was ranked as being one of the top ten currencies before 2014.

Primecoin has a block time of one minute, changes difficulty every block, and has a block reward that is a function of the difficulty.
