= Texas State Securities Board =

The Texas State Securities Board is a Texas state agency headquartered in Austin, Texas. State legislation established the Board in 1957 when the 55th Texas Legislature passed the Securities Act (S.B. 294), which created the State Securities Board, provided for the appointment of a commissioner, defined relevant terms, and outlined the responsibilities of the Board.

The board enforces the Texas Securities Act (TEX. REV. CIV. STAT. ANN. art. 581–1) and maintains programs for enforcement, registration of securities, registration of securities dealers, investment advisers, and agents, and inspections of registered firms. Prior to online databases, information about these registrations and some updates about the agency's activities were published in a monthly print bulletin issued by the Board.

The board has also developed and implemented an investor education program to inform the public about the basics of investing in securities, with a special emphasis on the prevention and detection of securities fraud. The agency has offices in Austin, Dallas, Houston, Lubbock, Corpus Christi, and San Antonio.

== Cryptocurrency ==
The Texas State Securities Board has actively considered potential issues related to cryptocurrency. According to the Board's annual financial report for fiscal year 2019:

The agency's law enforcement program has been a national leader in proactively thwarting investment frauds utilizing the Internet and other public media. In December 2017, Texas was the first state regulator to take action against a fraudulent investment scheme targeting Texas investors amidst the cryptocurrency 'craze.' The agency has since entered 26 orders against promoters of purported investment products attempting to capitalize on the emergence of digital assets.

In January 2018, the British company called Bit Connect received a cease-and-desist order by the Texas State Securities Board, since they promise massive monthly returns but haven't even registered with state securities regulators or cited an office address.
