= Cardano (blockchain platform) =

Public blockchain platform

Denominations
- Symbol: ADA, ₳
- Code: cardano-node
- Subunits
- 1/1000000: Lovelace

Development
- Original author(s): Charles Hoskinson & Jeremy Wood
- White paper: Cardano whitepaper
- Initial release: 27 September 2017 (9 years ago)
- Latest release: 9.1.0 / 24 July 2024 (2 years ago)
- Code repository: https://cardanoupdates.com/
- Development status: Active
- Written in: Haskell
- Operating system: Cross-platform
- Developer(s): Cardano Foundation, IOHK, EMURGO
- Source model: Free and open-source software
- License: Apache

Ledger
- Timestamping scheme: Proof of stake
- Block time: 20 seconds
- Block explorer: Adatools.io Pooltool.io Cardanoscan.io
- Circulating supply: 36.365 billion ₳ (as of Nov. 2023)
- Supply limit: 45 billion ₳

Valuation
- Exchange rate: Floating

Demographics
- Official user: ~3264 stake pools globally (as of Nov. 2023)

Website
- Website: cardano.org

Cardano is a public decentralized blockchain platform which uses the cryptocurrency, ADA, to facilitate transactions.

Cardano's development began in 2015. When launched in 2017, it was the largest cryptocurrency to use a proof of stake blockchain. A number of independent entities collaborate on the project, including the Cardano Foundation based in Zug, Switzerland, and led by its chief executive officer Frederik Gregaard.

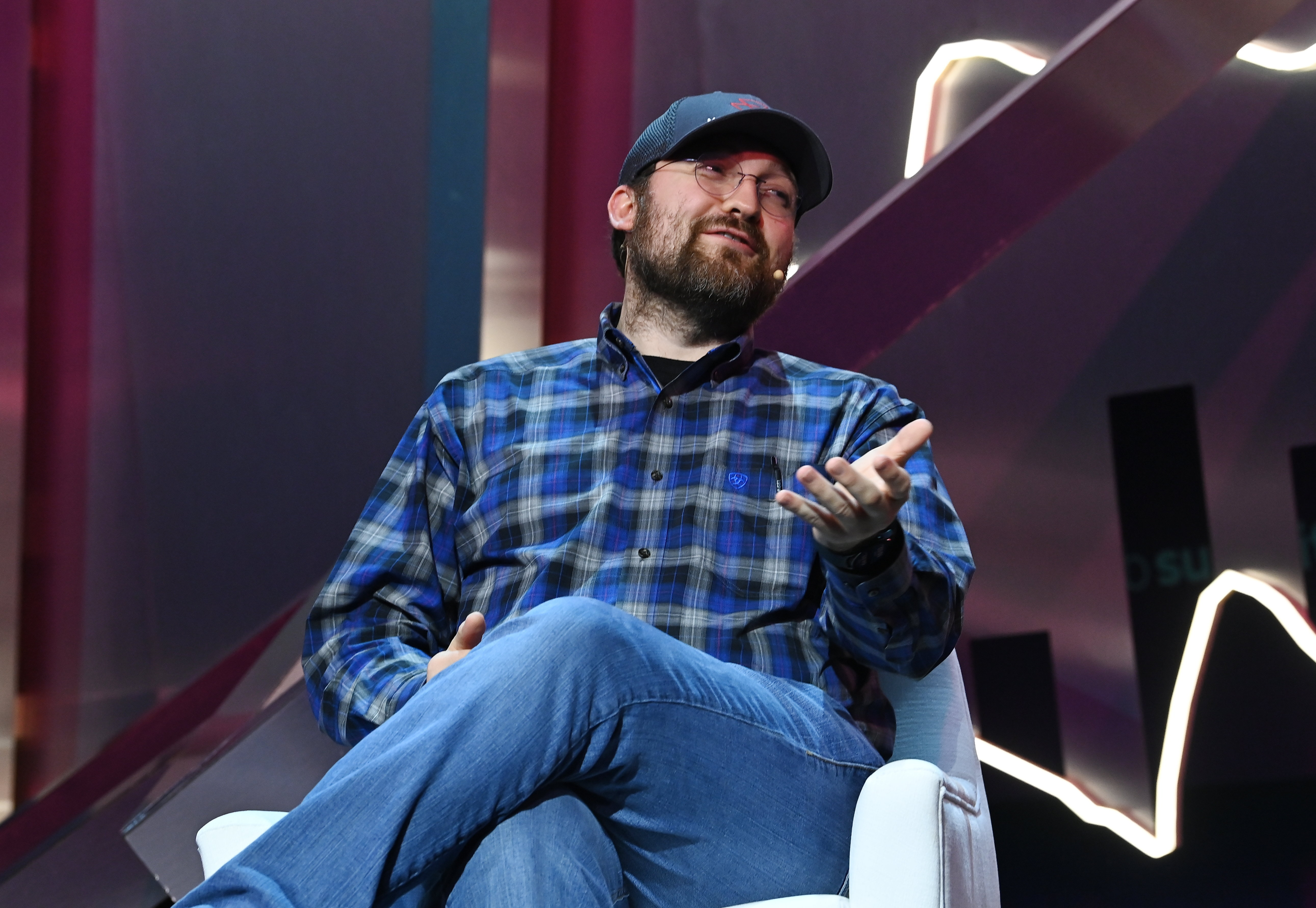
Cardano co-founder Charles Hoskinson. (2022, Web Summit)

== History ==
After leaving Ethereum in 2014, Charles Hoskinson and Jeremy Wood set out their plans for establishing Cardano in 2015. Hoskinson had left Ethereum after a dispute with another co-founder, Vitalik Buterin; Hoskinson wanted to accept venture capital and create a company, while Buterin wanted to keep it as a nonprofit organization. Wood and Hoskinson co-founded the business IOHK to develop blockchains for use by corporations, governments, and education institutions.

Cardano was initially released to the public in 2017. That year, IOHK partnered with the University of Edinburgh to launch the Blockchain Technology Laboratory. The lab had six post-doctoral and professorial positions with up to 35 jobs created in total, and was led by Aggelos Kiayias, developer of the Ouroboros protocol.

Cardano reached a market cap of $77 billion in May 2021, which was the fourth highest for a cryptocurrency at that time.

Advertising agency MBLM ranked Cardano 26th for brand intimacy out of 600 brands in August 2022, in between Ford and Nestlé and the highest rank for a cryptocurrency. Citing an MBLM partner, advertising industry magazine Ad Age said Cardano's high ranking "can likely be chalked up to the gambling element of crypto".

The platform is named after Italian mathematician Gerolamo Cardano, while the cryptocurrency itself is named after the English mathematician Ada Lovelace. The Ada sub-unit is the Lovelace; one Ada = 1,000,000 Lovelaces.

== Design ==
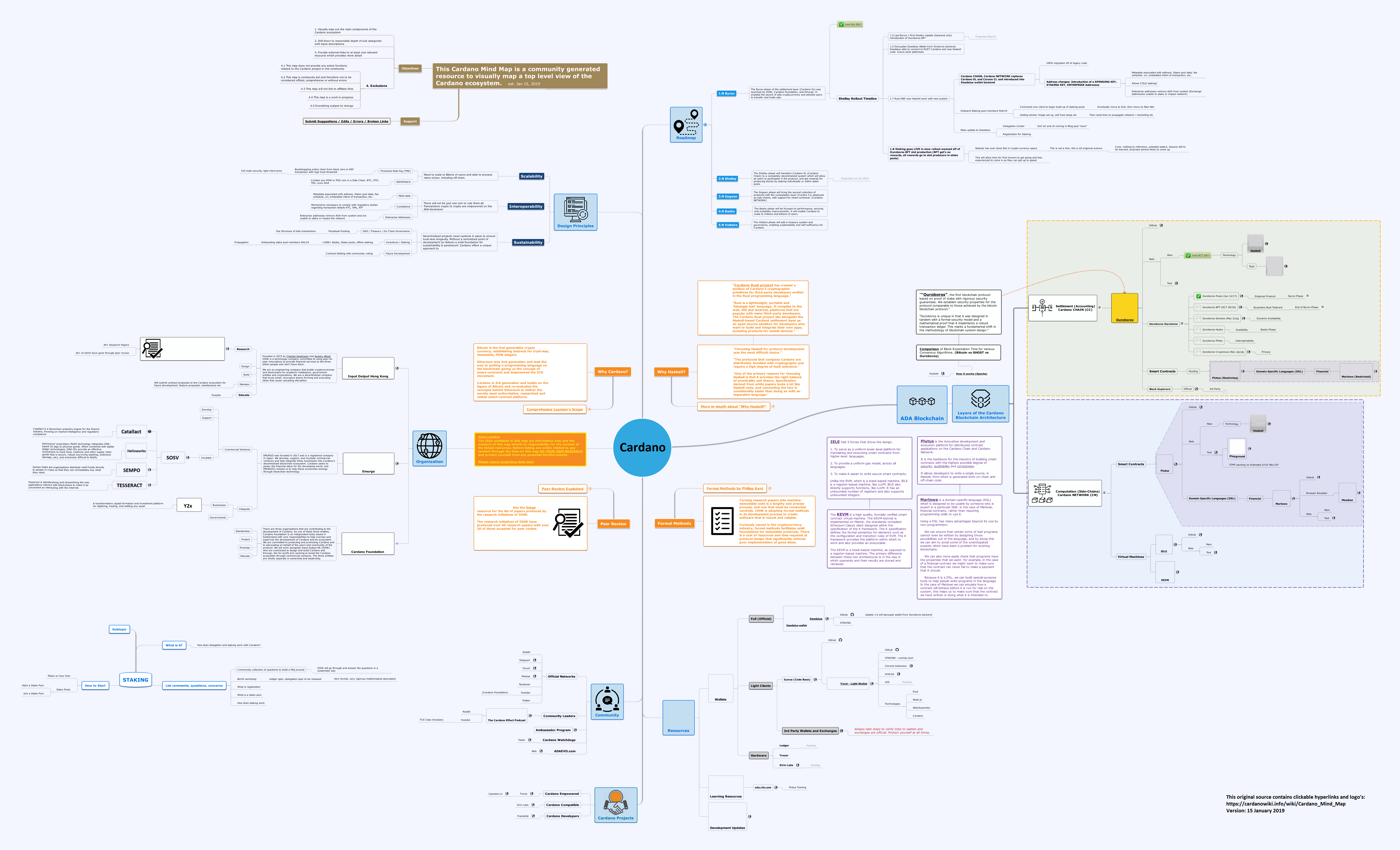
Mind map of Cardano technical overview, 2019

=== Governance ===
Cardano was originally controlled by three entities:

- Cardano Foundation aims to standardize and promote the ecosystem (based in Switzerland).
- IOHK: an engineering company responsible for building the Cardano blockchain.
- Emurgo: responsible for commercial applications.

=== Technical design ===
Atypically, Cardano does not have a foundational white paper. Instead, it uses design principles intended to overcome issues—such as scalability, interoperability, and a lack of regulatory compliance—faced by earlier cryptocurrencies. Cardano claims that it overcomes problems found in other cryptocurrencies, mainly that Bitcoin is too slow and inflexible and that Ethereum is not safe or scalable. Like Bitcoin, Cardano uses a UTXO ledger model, though it is an extended version (EUTXO) to facilitate smart contracts and scripting languages.

Cardano uses a proof-of-stake (PoS) protocol named Ouroboros; this was in contrast to Bitcoin and Ethereum, which used proof-of-work protocols (though the latter switched over in 2022). Proof-of-stake blockchains use far less energy than proof-of-work chains. This is achieved by eliminating the computing resources that a proof-of-work algorithm requires. In February 2021, Hoskinson estimated the Cardano network used 6 GWh annually, less than 0.01% of the 110.53 TWh used by the Bitcoin network as calculated by researchers at the University of Cambridge.

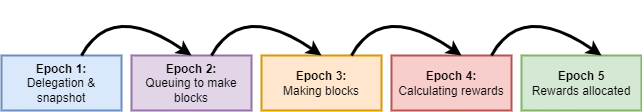
Figure 1: Epoch schedule for the Cardano blockchain. In Ouroboros, time is divided into slots of roughly 20 seconds, with epochs (aggregations of slots) lasting approximately 5 days.

Within the Cardano platform, the settlement layer keeps track of transactions. The second layer is the computation layer and is designed to be similar to Ethereum, enabling smart contracts and applications to run on the platform. Like other cryptocurrencies, Ada (ADA) can be stored on a digital wallet. Cardano's native digital wallet is named "Daedalus". The Daedalus wallet downloads a full copy of the entire transaction history of the Cardano blockchain. Wallet users face the risk of losing access to funds if the wallet's seed phrase is lost or stolen.

Development phases of Cardano are named after notable figures in poetry and computer science: Byron, Shelley, Goguen, Basho, and Voltaire. The first three stages implemented a basic blockchain, and then implemented decentralisation and smart contracts. The Basho era focuses on scaling the blockchain. The Voltaire release adds a treasury model.

Once part of Cardano's Voltaire phase, CIP-1694 was implemented through the Chang upgrade and subsequent Plomin hard fork in 2024 establishing "on-chain" governance. This transition enabled ADA token holders to create, vote on and implement proposals through a decentralized decision-making process, marking IOHK's successful transfer of network development control to the community.

As with other proof-of-stake cryptocurrencies, Cardano offers "staking", which allows token holders to set-aside (delegate) tokens to potentially "validate" transactions on the same blockchain (Figure 1). The quantity of tokens staked corresponds with the likelihood of being chosen to validate a transaction, and thus be rewarded by the algorithm with more of the same token. Through various wallet implementations, users can participate in "staking pools" with other token holders. These staked tokens have a dual purpose, both securing the network through validation and enabling participation in the governance system.

== Cardano Foundation ==
Since 2021, Frederik Gregaard has been the CEO of the Cardano Foundation.

== Applications ==
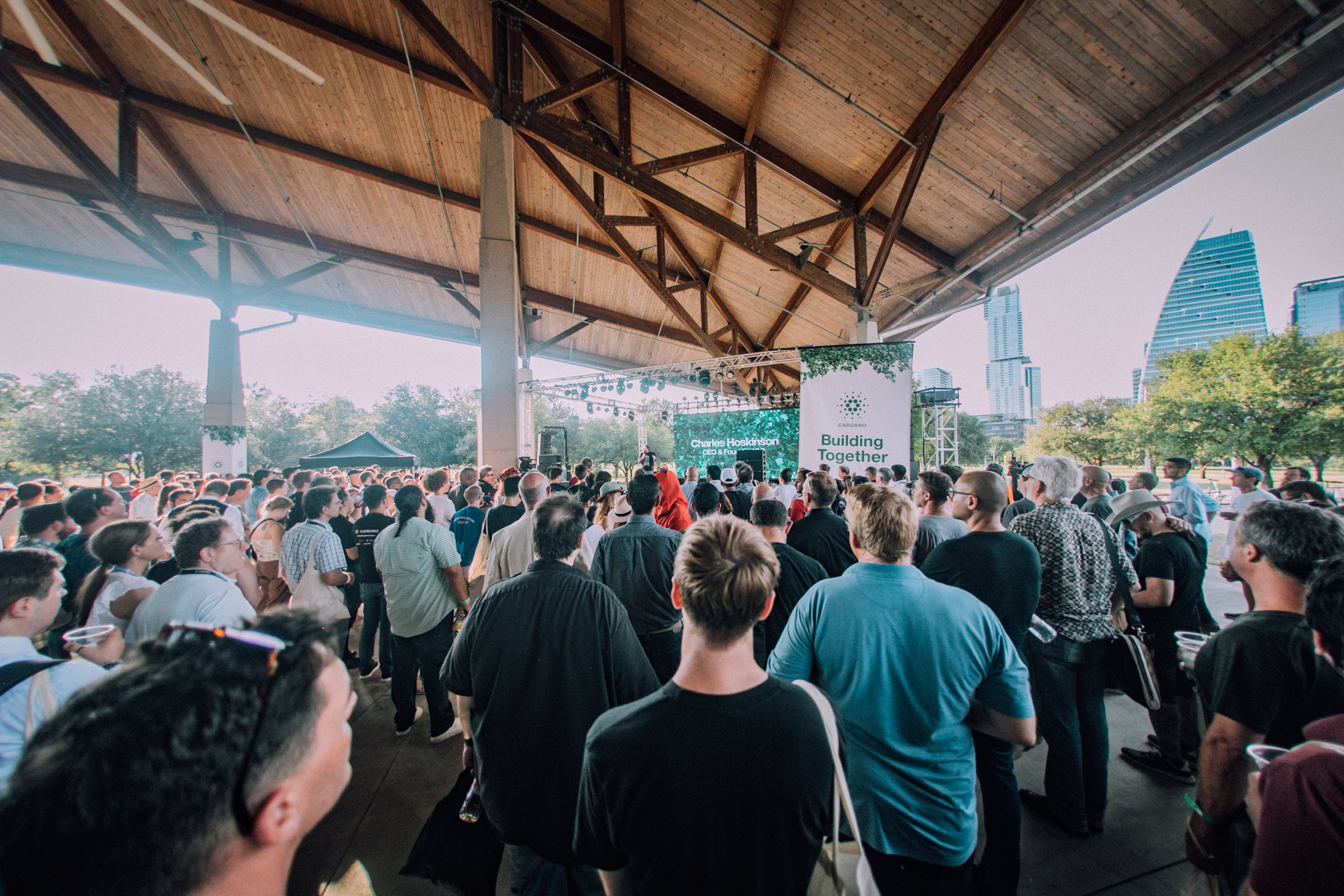
People in Consensus conference, 2022

Applications of the Cardano blockchain include:

- In 2018, IOHK signed a memorandum of understanding with the government of Ethiopia to consider the use of Cardano in its coffee supply chain. The partnership with the Ethiopian government also investigate other ways to deploy Cardano in the country.
- In 2019, the Ministry of Education in the country of Georgia signed a memorandum of understanding with the Free University of Tbilisi to use Cardano and Atala, IOHK's decentralized identity software, to build a credential verification system for Georgia.
- In 2019, New Balance announced a pilot program on the Cardano blockchain so buyers could track the authenticity of OMN1S Kawhi Leonard basketball shoes.
- In April 2021, IOHK and the Ethiopia Ministry of Education announced plans for an identity and record-keeping system on Cardano and Atala for the country's five million school pupils.
- In 2021, Hoskinson began working with electronic dance music DJ Paul Oakenfold to release an album, Zombie Lobster, on the Cardano blockchain.
- In 2021, IOHK and Dish Network announced a collaboration to investigate the use of distributed ledger technology.
- The Cardano blockchain was cited in Quartz as having the potential to help citizens in Zanzibar, Ethiopia, and Burundi get digital IDs.
- World Mobile Token (WMT), a project built on Cardano, offers remote mobile network access in Africa with approximately 150 nodes in East Africa (2022). Mark Cuban is cited as being skeptical about the project and Cardano adoption.
- In 2023, a Ghanaian startup named "Mazzuma" received funding from the Adaverse, a Cardano ecosystem accelerator. MassumaGPT aims to use AI in its contract creation platform.

=== Decentralized finance ===
Cardano implemented decentralized finance (DeFi) services on September 12, 2021, including an upgrade to enable smart contracts and the ability to build decentralized applications (DApps). Also included is Plutus, a smart contract language written in Haskell, and Marlowe, a domain-specific language designed by Simon Thompson for non-programmers in the financial sector.

=== Partner chains ===
In November 2023 Cardano began introducing sidechains, referred to by the project as "partner chains". Sidechains are intended to perform off-chain computations, known as smart contracts, while using the Cardano network for settlement. The first example of such a chain, named "Midnight", will make use of the Polkadot framework in combination with Cardano.

=== Non-fungible tokens (NFTs) ===
Cardano also enables creating non-fungible tokens (NFTs). Snoop Dogg released several thousand NFTs in a project named "Baked Nation" for the Cardano chain in April 2022. In 2023 a digital artist from the UK sold 7,200 individual works of humanoid deer for almost £500,000 on Cardano.

== Legal status and regulation ==
In 2023, the Securities and Exchange Commission (SEC), a US regulator, issued a complaint against the cryptocurrency exchange Kraken for offering unregistered securities (in violation of the Securities Act) and promising returns on investment for staking in multiple proof-of-stake cryptocurrencies, including Cardano. Without any admission of wrongdoing, Kraken agreed to pay a fine of $30 million and halt its staking program in response.

In June 2023, the SEC sued Binance. Among the allegations was that Cardano was a security and so the cryptocurrency exchange was trading illegally in the US. IOG responded that the filing was inaccurate and that Ada was not a security. Robinhood Markets said it would remove Cardano and two other proof of stake coins from its platform. The Ada price fell from $0.38 to $0.26 in a day on the FT Wilshire index. Both the Wall Street Journal and The Times linked a fall in the price of Cardano – 19 per cent in June – and a slide for other major coins to the SEC's actions. In late November, Robinhood re-enabled trading in Ada. The price was $1.09 at the end of the month.
