= Charles Hoskinson =

American cryptocurrency entrepreneur

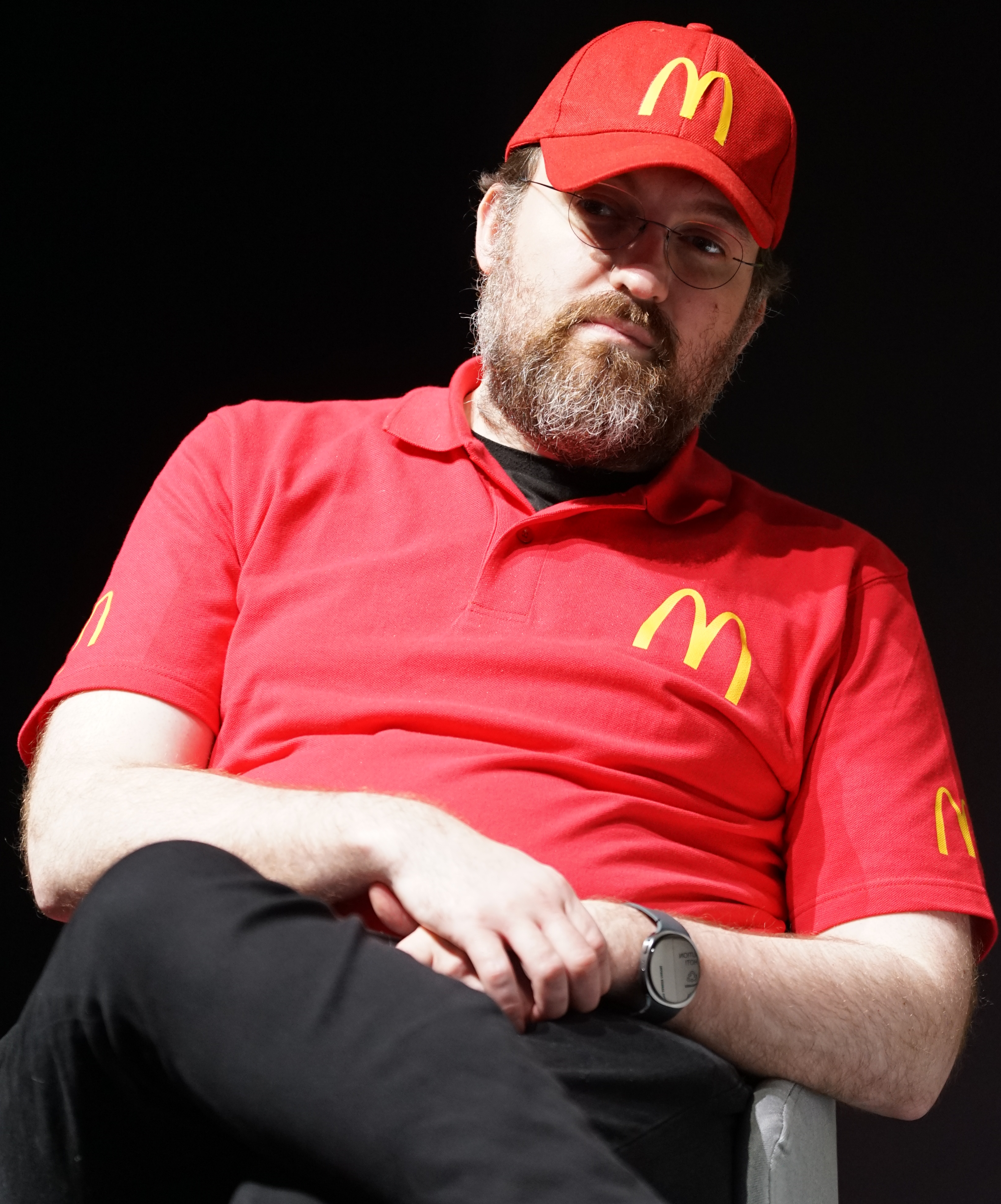
- Hoskinson in February 2026
- Born: 5 November 1987; Maui, Hawaii, U.S.
- Education: Metropolitan State University of Denver (attended); University of Colorado Boulder (attended)
- Known for: Founder of Cardano, co-founder of Ethereum
- Scientific career
- Fields: Digital contracts, digital currencies
- Website: iog.io

Charles Hoskinson (born 5 November 1987 on Maui, Hawaii) is an American entrepreneur who is a co-founder of the blockchain engineering company IOHK, and the Cardano blockchain platform, and was a co-founder of the Ethereum blockchain platform.

== Early life and education ==
Hoskinson attended Metropolitan State University of Denver and the University of Colorado Boulder to study mathematics. Hoskinson has said that he had entered a PhD program but had dropped out. MSU Denver does not have a graduate program in mathematics. Hoskinson also said that he worked for the Defense Advanced Research Projects Agency (DARPA), though DARPA said that he had not.

== Career ==
In 2013, Hoskinson quit a consulting job to begin a project called the Bitcoin Education Project. According to Hoskinson, the limited supply makes Bitcoin like a digital form of gold.

The logo of Cardano, a cryptocurrency developed by Hoskinson's company, IOHK.

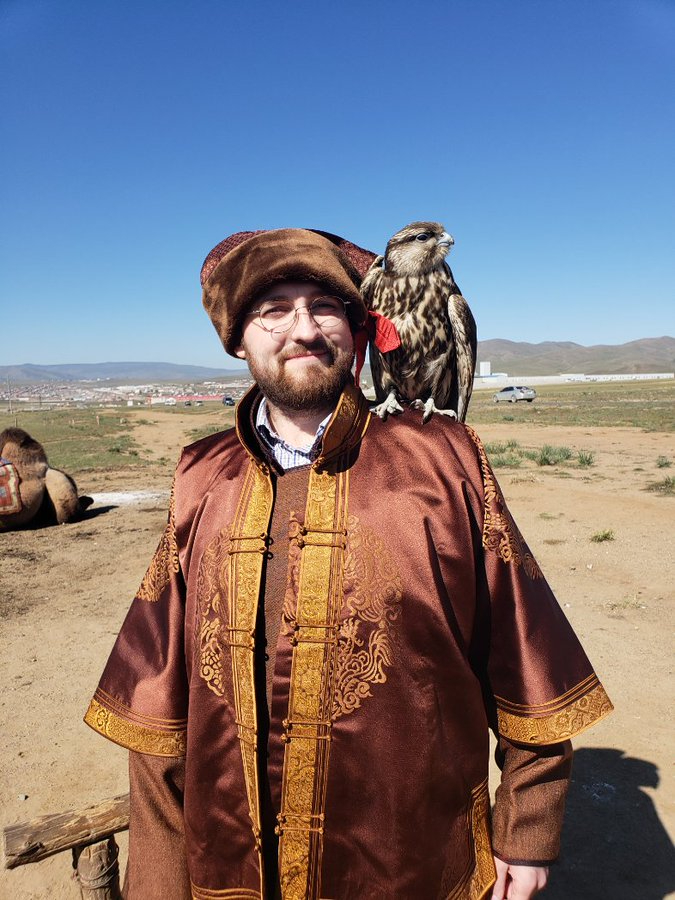
Hoskinson in Mongolia in 2018

He joined the Ethereum team as one of five original founders with Vitalik Buterin in late 2013 and held the position of chief executive. Buterin and the Ethereum team removed Hoskinson in 2014 after a dispute over whether the project should be commercial (Hoskinson's view) or a nonprofit (Buterin's view).

In late 2014, Hoskinson and former Ethereum colleague Jeremy Wood formed IOHK (Input Output Hong Kong), an engineering and research company, to build cryptocurrencies and blockchains. IOHK's key project is Cardano, a public blockchain and smart contract platform that hosts the ADA cryptocurrency. Hoskinson did not pursue venture capital for Cardano, saying that it ran counter to the blockchain's principles. Hoskinson has also said that venture capital involvement might lead to an outsized control of a project.

IOHK has sponsored research focused on blockchain technology at the University of Edinburgh, Tokyo Institute of Technology, Stanford University, and the University of Wyoming.

Forbes magazine estimated Hoskinson's wealth as $500m–$600m in 2018.

== Philanthropy ==
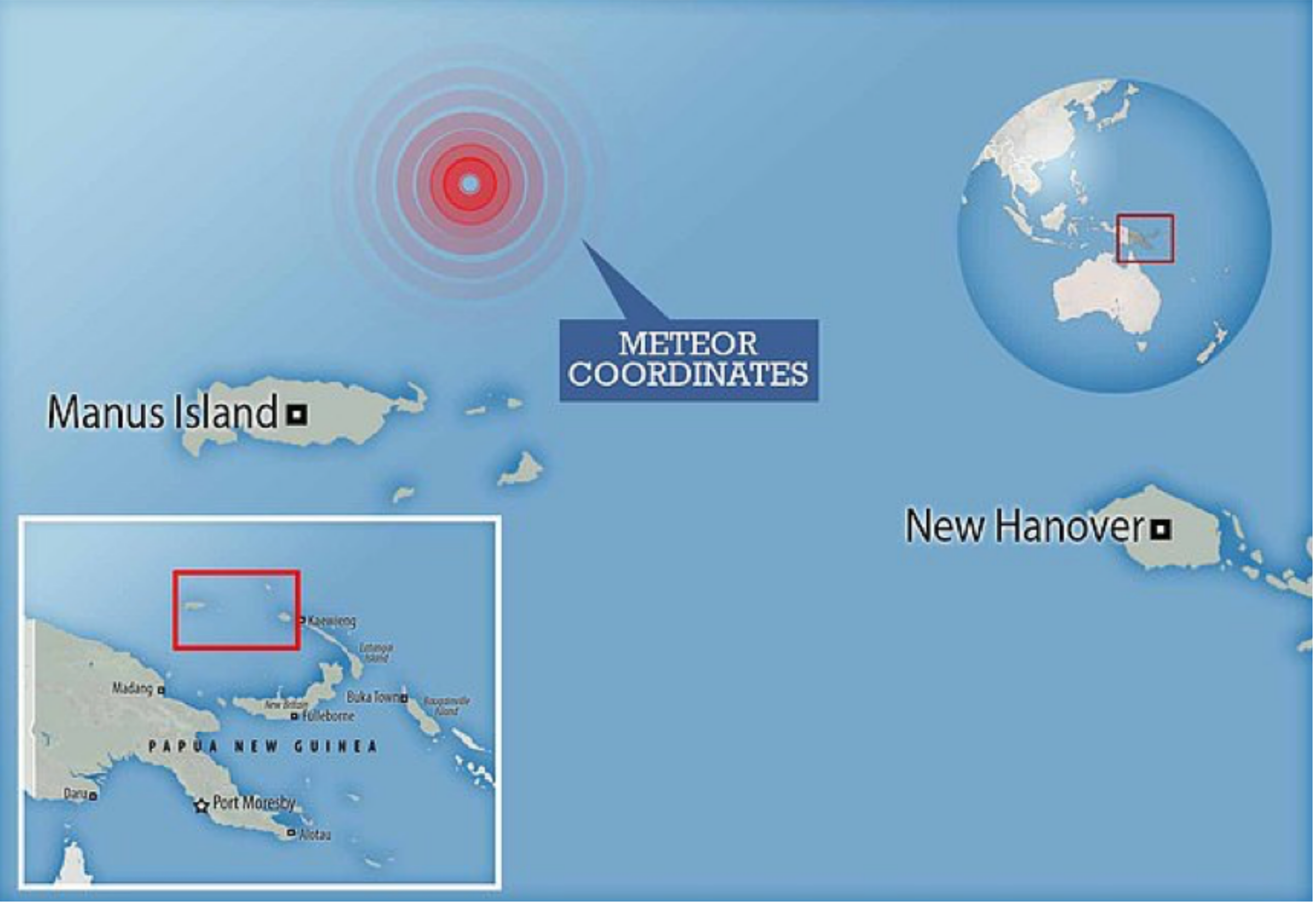
Location of the ocean deep water expedition and the Galileo Project

In September 2021, Hoskinson donated $20 million to Carnegie Mellon University's philosophy department to establish and run the Hoskinson Center for Formal Mathematics with the goal of studying formal logical systems.

Hoskinson contributed $1.5 million to fund a 2023 Galileo Project expedition led by astronomer and "alien hunter" Avi Loeb to explore debris from the meteorite CNEOS 2014-01-08 (also called IM1) that crashed into the Pacific Ocean in 2014. Loeb argued that this object could have been created by alien life, an idea that lacked widespread support from the scientific community. The expedition reported finding tiny metallic spheres from the object on the ocean floor. Loeb claimed his team's analysis of these spherules did not match any known alloy, though it was unclear whether they were artificial or natural in origin. However, a paper published by the American Astronomical Society In October showed that the chemical compositions provided by Loeb's analysis most closely matched human-produced coal ash.

== Personal life ==
As of 2022, Hoskinson purchased an 11,000-acre buffalo ranch near Wheatland, Wyoming, donated equipment to the Platte County Sheriff's Office, and purchased a restaurant in Wheatland. He also has a farm in Boulder, Colorado.

In 2023 Hoskinson, along with his father and brother, who are both physicians, opened the Hoskinson Health and Wellness Clinic in Gillette, Wyoming. The clinic focuses on anti-ageing and regenerative medicine. The director of the clinic said it had cost $18 million. Hoskinson said cryptocurrency would be accepted in the future.

Hoskinson was criticised after his private jet was ranked among the top 15 biggest polluters in the US on the Climate Jets website. Commentators contrasted the "green" reputation of Cardano with Hoskinson's personal travel. He defended his jet use, saying the plane had been used for charters for the band Metallica and film industry workers.

== Political views ==
In 2007, Hoskinson, "an anti-war Republican college student with an interest in monetary policy", worked as a fundraiser for the Republican presidential campaign of the Texas congressman Ron Paul. However, he grew disillusioned with the prospects for anti-government activism. "Libertarianism has always had a [bank] check it can't cash," he said, "Just because we distrust the government doesn't mean we don't need a governing structure." He then discovered bitcoin and began exploring cryptocurrency.

In May 2024, Slate magazine reported that Hoskinson was one of the technology and finance "disrupters" who were backing Robert F. Kennedy Jr.'s 2024 presidential campaign.

Hoskinson announced a new political action committee called "Wyoming Integrity" in February 2025, followed by a meeting with Wyoming state lawmakers. He intended to challenge the way the state had excluded Cardano from plans for a state stablecoin.
