= List of Whitman College alumni =

Whitman College is a private liberal arts college in Walla Walla, Washington. Following are some of its notable alumni.

== Academia ==
Name	Class	Major	Notability	References
Roland Bainton	1914		Protestant church historian and professor of ecclesiastical history at Yale Divinity School	
Robert Clodius	1942		Educator and acting president of University of Wisconsin–Madison	
Paula England	1971	Sociology and psychology	Sociologist, professor at New York University	
Reginald Green	1955		Development economist and academic	
Torey Hayden	1973	Biology and chemistry	Child psychologist, special education teacher, university lecturer, and author	
Stephen A. Hayner	1970	English literature	President of Columbia Theological Seminary	
Dan Fenno Henderson	1944		Founder of the University of Washington Asian Law program	
Wanjiru Kamau-Rutenberg	2001	Politics	Executive in residence at Schmidt Futures, former professor at the University of San Francisco	
Ben Kerkvliet	1965		Author and educator in comparative politics, Southeast Asia, and Asian studies	
Frances Penrose Owen	1919	Greek	First female regent of Washington State University	
Gordon Wright	1933	BA	History professor at the University of Oregon and Stanford University	
Robert W. Young	1955		Linguist known for his work on the Navajo language, professor at the University of New Mexico	

== Art ==
Name	Class	Major	Notability	References
Marcus Amerman	1981	Art	Artist	
Douglas Cole	1960	Art history	Historian and professor specializing in art and Pacific Northwest cultural history	
David Crockett Graham	1908	BA	Curator of the Museum of Art, Archaeology, and Ethnology at the West China Union University and field collector for the Smithsonian	

== Business ==
Name	Class	Major	Notability	References
Ralph Cordiner	1922	Economics and political science	CEO and chairman, General Electric, Corp. (1958–1963); president (1950–1958)	
Stephanie Dorgan	1977	Economics	Founder and owner of Seattle music venue The Crocodile	
Ashifi Gogo	2005	Mathematics and physics	Co-founder of Sproxil	
Wanjiru Kamau-Rutenberg	2001	Politics	Executive in residence at Schmidt Futures	
John W. Stanton	1977	Political science	Founder and CEO, Western Wireless, majority owner of the Seattle Mariners	
Colleen Willoughby	1955		Founder of the Washington Women's Foundation and the director of Global Women Partners in Philanthropy	

== Entertainment ==
Name	Class	Major	Notability	References
Anomie Belle	2002	Sociology	Professional musician and artivist	
Dirk Benedict	1967	Dramatic art	Actor known for Battlestar Galactica and The A-Team	
Chastity Belt	2010		Indie-rock band formed by Whitman students	
Otto Harbach	c. 1900	MA	Lyricist and librettist of about fifty musical comedies, including The Desert Song	
Cullen Hoback	2003		Filmmaker, Monster Camp Terms and Conditions May Apply, What Lies Upstream, Q Into the Storm, Money Electric: The Bitcoin Mystery	
Shane Johnson	1998		Actor, Saving Private Ryan, Black Cadillac	
Morten Lauridsen	1965		Composer and professor emeritus of composition at the USC Thornton School of Music	
Lela Loren	2002	Theatre	Television actress	
John Moe	1990	Dramatic art	NPR host and author	
Lance Norris	1985	Dramatic art	Actor known for Mystic River	
Patrick Page	1985		Actor and playwright	
Kathryn Shaw	1971	Dramatic art	Artistic director of Studio 58 at Langara College	
Rick Stevenson	1977	History	Film writer, director, and producer	
Adam West	1951	English	Actor known for Batman and Family Guy	

== Government and military ==
Name	Class	Major	Notability	References
Alan K. Campbell	1947		First director of the United States Office of Personnel Management	
Alan W. Jones	1917	non-degreed	U.S. Army major general	
Neil Kornze	2000	Politics	Former director of the U.S. Bureau of Land Management	

== Law ==
Name	Class	Major	Notability	References
Meda Chesney-Lind	1969		Criminologist and advocate for girls and women in the criminal justice system in Hawaii	
Kenneth Culp Davis	1931		Legal scholar remembered as "the father of administrative law"	
William O. Douglas	1920	English and economics	U.S. Supreme Court justice	
James Alger Fee	1910		Judge of the United States Court of Appeals for the Ninth Circuit	
W. Michael Gillette	1963	BA	Oregon Supreme Court justice	
Lucile Lomen	1941		First woman to serve as a law clerk for a Supreme Court justice	
James L. Robart	1969		Judge of the United States District Court for the Western District of Washington	
Charles F. Stafford	1940		Justice of the Washington Supreme Court	

== Literature and journalism ==
Name	Class	Major	Notability	References
Nate Cohn	2010	BA	Journalist for The New York Times	
Craig Lesley	1967		Novelist who has been nominated for the Pulitzer Prize	
John Markoff	1971	Sociology	The New York Times journalist and co-author of Takedown	
Edward P. Morgan	1932		Journalist and writer who reported for newspapers, radio, and television media services including ABC, CBS, and PBS	
Anne Helen Petersen	2003	Rhetoric and Film Studies	Journalist for BuzzFeed News, writes the newsletter Culture Study	

== Politics ==
Name	Class	Major	Notability	References
Jack Burtch	1951	Political science	Washington state representative	
Ryan Crocker	1971	English	U.S. ambassador to Afghanistan, Iraq, Lebanon, Kuwait, Syria, and Pakistan	
Jena Griswold	2006	Politics	Secretary of state of Colorado	
Hal Holmes	1923		United States House of Representatives	
Walt Minnick	1964		Former Idaho congressman	
Pat Thibaudeau	1960	Psychology	Former Washington state senator	
Al Ullman	1935		United States House of Representatives for 24 years	
Ben Westlund	1971	Education and history	Former Oregon state treasurer	

== Science and medicine ==
Name	Class	Major	Notability	References
Alexander Barnes	2003	Chemistry	Chemist, professor, and recipient of the Camille Dreyfus Teacher-Scholar Award	
J. Bruce Beckwith	1954		Pediatric pathologist known for helping to identify Beckwith-Wiedemann syndrome	
Gerard van Belle	1990	Physics and astronomy	Astronomer	
Bernard Berelson	1934	English	Behavioral scientist known for work on communication and mass media	
Walker Bleakney	1924	Physics	Inventor of mass spectrometer, chair of department of physics at Princeton University	
Robert Brattain	1931	Physics	Physicist	
Walter Brattain	1924	Physics	Nobel Prize winner, physicist, and co-inventor of the transistor	
Robert Brode	1921		Physicist and leader at the Manhattan Project's Los Alamos Laboratory	
Wallace R. Brode	1921	BA	Chemist, specializing in the absorption spectra of dyes	
William M. Fairbank	1939		Physicist known for his work on liquid helium	
Dorothy Metcalf-Lindenburger	1997	Geology	NASA astronaut	
Webb Miller	1965	BA	Computational biology pioneer	
David R. Nygren	1960		Particle physicist, inventor of the time projection chamber	
Edith Quimby	1912	Mathematics and physics	Medical researcher and physicist	
Vladimir Rojansky	1924	BS	Physicist, one of the earliest researchers of quantum mechanics	
E. J. Workman	1924	BS	Atmospheric physicist	

== Sports ==
Name	Class	Major	Notability	References
Mara Abbott	2008	Economics	Professional cyclist	
Ingrid Backstrom	2000	Geology	Professional skier	
Holly Brooks	2004	Sociology and environmental studies	Winter Olympian in Nordic skiing	
Derrike Cope	1980		NASCAR driver, 1990 Daytona 500 winner	
Ben Eisenhardt	2014		Professional player in the Israeli Basketball Premier League	
Tommy Lloyd	1998	Biology	Head basketball coach at the University of Arizona	

== Technology ==
Name	Class	Major	Notability	References
Marlin Eller	1974	Mathematics	Programmer and software developer, co-author of Barbarians Led by Bill Gates	
Steve McConnell	1985	Philosophy, mathematics, and computer science	Software engineer and author of Code Complete	
