= Hyperobject Industries =

Film and television production company

- Type: Private
- Industry: Production company
- Predecessor: Gary Sanchez Productions
- Founded: October 25, 2019; 6 years ago in Los Angeles, California, U.S.
- Founder: Adam McKay
- Headquarters: Los Angeles, California, U.S.
- Key people: Adam McKay (CEO)
- Owner: Adam McKay
- Website: hyperobjectindustries.com

Hyperobject Industries is an American film and television production company founded by director, producer, screenwriter, and comedian Adam McKay on October 25, 2019.

== History ==
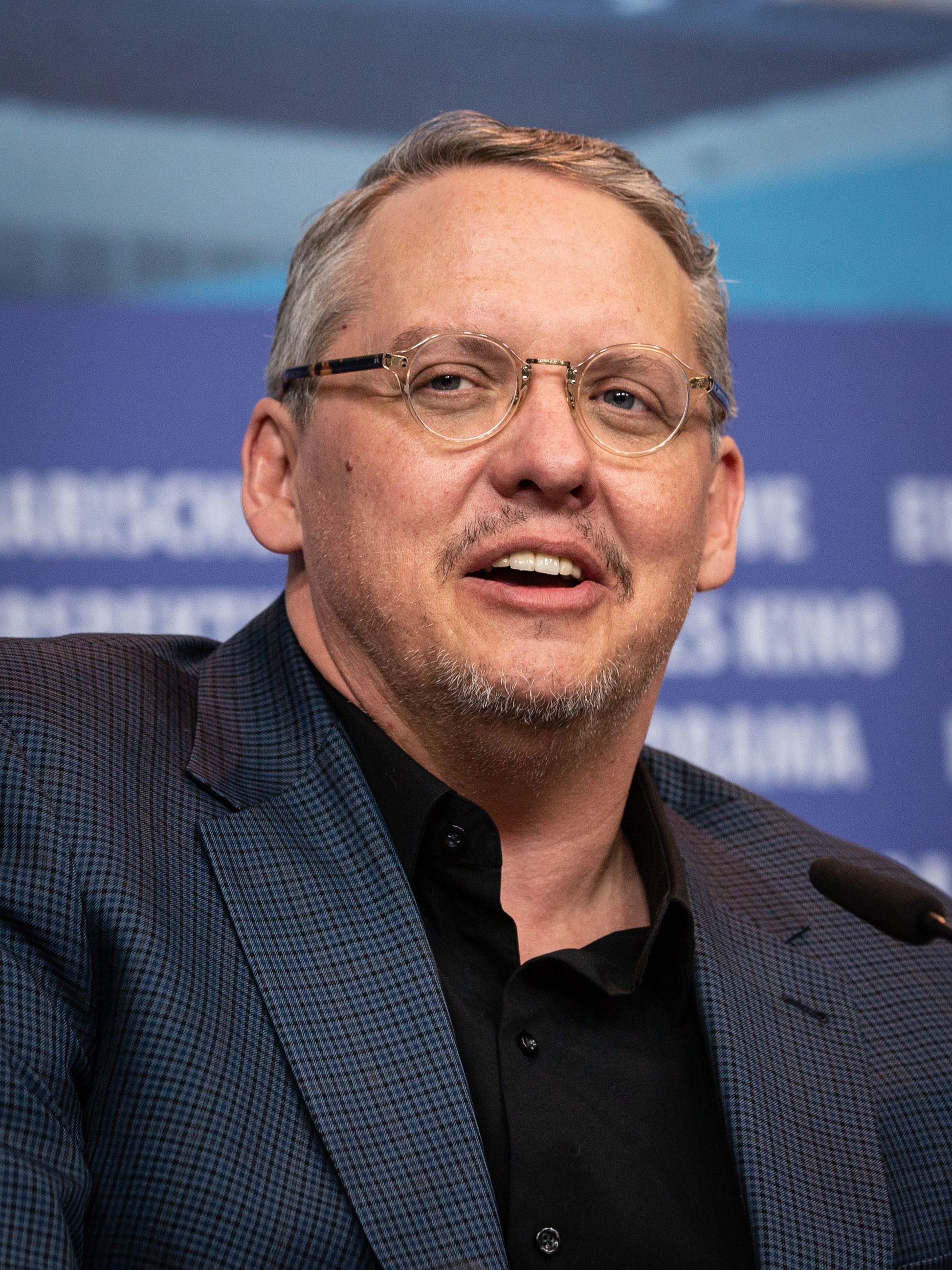
The company's founder, Adam McKay in 2019

Hyperobject Industries was founded on October 25, 2019, by director, producer, screenwriter, and comedian Adam McKay. McKay created the company after leaving Gary Sanchez Productions in April 2019, a production company he co-founded with Will Ferrell in 2006. In October 2019, the company entered an exclusive five-year first-look television deal with Home Box Office, Inc., developing content for HBO and its on demand streaming service, HBO Max.

In November 2019, the company entered a first-look feature film deal with Paramount Pictures. Also in November 2019, Hyperobject Industries formed a multi-year agreement, joint venture with Adam Davidson, Laura Mayer, and Sony Music Entertainment to create Three Uncanny Four Productions, a podcasting company. Hyperobject Industries and the joint venture's partnership will create, develop, produce, and distribute original podcasts.

In July 2021, the company entered an exclusive multi-year first-look production deal, specifically scripted feature films, with Apple Inc.

In December 2021, the company's debut film, Don't Look Up, began its limited theatrical release on December 10, 2021, and begin streaming on Netflix on December 24, 2021. The film became the second most-watched film on Netflix within 28 days of release.

== Filmography ==
=== Film ===
Year	Title	Director	Gross (worldwide)	Notes	Ref.
2021	Don't Look Up	Adam McKay	$791,863 (Note: Limited theatrical release, currently the second most-watched film on Netflix within 28 days of release.)	with Bluegrass Films	
2022	Fresh	Mimi Cave	—N/a	with Legendary Entertainment	
2022	The Holly	Julian Rubinstein	TBA		
2022	The Menu	Mark Mylod	$79.6 million	with Gary Sanchez Productions	
2023	Wild Summon	Karni Arieli; Saul Freed	—N/a	Short film with Sulkybunny and New Native Pictures	
2023	BS High	Martin Desmond Roe; Travon Free	—N/a	with HBO Sports, SMAC Entertainment, Moore Street Productions, The Athletic, and Matador Content	
2024	Union	Brett Story; Stephen Maing	$47,883	with Level Ground Productions, Impact Partners, Ford Foundation, Anonymous Content	
2024	Wild Wild Space	Ross Kauffman	—N/a	with HBO Documentary Films, Amblin Documentaries and Zero Point Zero Production	
2024	Money Electric: The Bitcoin Mystery	Cullen Hoback	—N/a	with Hyrax Films Production, and Hello Pictures	
2024	Men of War	Jen Gatien; Billy Corben	—N/a	with Neon, Deerjen and Rakontur	
2025	All the Empty Rooms	Joshua Seftel	—N/a	with Netflix, Smartypants and Artemis Rising Foundation	
2026	Stormbound	Miko Lim	—N/a	with Anagram Pictures	
2026	Thrash	Tommy Wirkola	—N/a	with Sony Pictures	

==== In development ====
- Five (with TriStar Pictures)
- Flesh of the Gods (with augenschein Filmproduktion, Nevermind Pictures, and A24)
- Hotel Hotel Hotel Hotel (with Princess Pictures and A24)
- Monsanto (with Onda Entertainment and KrautPack Entertainment)
- The Parlay (with Amazon MGM Studios)
- Seeker (with Hammerstone Studios and Arkhum Productions)
- Untitled DeSean Jackson documentary film (Go Deep (wt); with CoverStory and Amazon Prime Video)
- Untitled Michael Shanks sci-fi comedy film (with 1.21 Pictures and Sony Pictures)

=== Television ===
Year	Title	Network	Notes	Ref.
2019–2023 (Note: While the series premiered in 2018, it was only since second season in 2019 that McKay separated from Gary Sanchez Productions that Hyperobject Industries got added as a production company in closing logos. Thereby, also making it the first ever credit for this venture across any medium even as McKay continues to be credited alongside his Gary Sanchez partner Will Ferrell in a single card as an executive producer.)	Succession	HBO	with Gary Sanchez Productions, Project Zeus, Hot Seat Productions, and HBO Entertainment	
2020–2022	Motherland: Fort Salem	Freeform	with Gary Sanchez Productions, Well Underway, and Freeform Studios	
2020	537 Votes	HBO	with Rakontur and HBO Documentary Films	
2021–2023	Painting with John	HBO		
2021	Q: Into the Storm	HBO	with Hyrax Films and HBO Documentary Films	
2021	The Oxy Kingpins	CBC Gem	Premiered at the 2021 SXSW Film Festival with Second Nature Films, Syd York, TYT Productions, and XRM Media	
2022–2023	Winning Time: The Rise of the Lakers Dynasty	HBO	with HBO Entertainment, Steeplechase Amusements, Jim Hecht Productions, and Jason Shuman Productions	
2022–2023	Game Theory With Bomani Jones	HBO		
2022	The Invisible Pilot	HBO	with Ample Entertainment	
2022	God Forbid: The Sex Scandal That Brought Down a Dynasty	Hulu		
2025–present	The Chair Company	HBO	with Zanin Corp and HBO Entertainment	

==== In development ====
- Perversion of Justice: The Jeffrey Epstein Story (with Sony Pictures Television)

== Podcast ==
Year	Title	Host(s)	Genre	Notes	Ref.
2020	Staying In with Emily and Kumail	Emily V. Gordon	Comedy	with Three Uncanny Four Productions	
2020	Staying In with Emily and Kumail	Kumail Nanjiani	Comedy	with Three Uncanny Four Productions	
2021–present	Death At The Wing	Adam McKay	Sports, politics, socioeconomics	with Three Uncanny Four Productions	
2021–present	Things You Don't Need to Know	Ari Cagan	Trivia, Knowledge	with Three Uncanny Four Productions	
2022–present	Réunion: Shark Attacks in Paradise	Daniel Duane	Knowledge	with Little Everywhere and Sony Music Entertainment	
2022–present	Bedtime Stories With Adam McKay	Adam McKay	Comedy	with Sony Music Entertainment	
