= Wei Dai =

Cryptocurrency pioneer

- Education: University of Washington
- Occupation: Computer engineer
- Known for: b-money, Crypto++, VMAC
- Website: www.weidai.com

Wei Dai (Chinese: 戴维) is a computer engineer known for contributions to cryptography and cryptocurrencies. He developed the Crypto++ cryptographic library, proposed the b-money cryptocurrency system, and co-proposed the VMAC message authentication algorithm.

== Education and career ==
Dai graduated from the University of Washington with a degree in computer science, just before proposing b-money in 1998.

In 2015, The New York Times described Dai as an "intensely private computer engineer". Wei Dai was a member of the Cypherpunks and Extropians mailing lists in the 1990s, and later SL4. On SL4 he exchanged with people such as Eliezer Yudkowsky, Robin Hanson, Nick Bostrom, Aubrey de Grey, Anders Sandberg, and others in a nascent rationalist community.

Dai has contributed to the field of cryptography and identified a cipher block chaining (CBC) vulnerability in SSH2; his work also informed the browser exploit against SSL/TLS known as BEAST (Browser Exploit Against SSL/TLS), developed by Juliano Rizzo and Thai Duong in 2011.

Dai said that he had declined an invitation to invest in Anthropic's initial funding round because he did not want to contribute to existential risk from artificial intelligence or signal approval of Anthropic's approach to AI safety.

=== Crypto++ ===
Crypto++ is an open-source C++ library that provides implementations of cryptographic algorithms. It was originally written by Dai and first released in 1995. In June 2015 Dai stepped away from the Crypto++ project to work on other projects, with the Crypto++ community continuing to maintain the project.

=== b-money ===
In 1998, Dai helped to spark interest in cryptocurrencies with the publication of "b-money, an anonymous, distributed electronic cash system". In the paper, Dai outlines the basic properties of his proposed system: "...a scheme for a group of untraceable digital pseudonyms to pay each other with money and to enforce contracts amongst themselves without outside help".

The paper describes two protocols: one in which all participants maintain account balances, and another in which a subset of servers maintains them.

=== VMAC ===
VMAC is a block cipher-based message authentication code (MAC) algorithm using a universal hash proposed by Ted Krovetz and Wei Dai in April 2007. The algorithm was designed for high performance backed by a formal analysis.

== Influence on the development of bitcoin ==
Described as "money which is impossible to regulate", Dai's b-money described some concepts later implemented in bitcoin and other cryptocurrencies. The proposal included:

- Creating money requires a specified amount of computational work (aka Proof of work).
- The work done is verified by participants who update separate account records.
- The worker is awarded funds for their effort.
- Exchange of funds is accomplished by collective bookkeeping and authenticated with digital signatures.
- Contracts provide for collateral and an agreed arbitrator; parties broadcast their digital signatures based on public key cryptography.

=== Relationship with Satoshi Nakamoto ===
Wei Dai and Adam Back were the first two people contacted by Satoshi Nakamoto as he was developing bitcoin in 2008 and the b-money paper was referenced in the subsequent Bitcoin whitepaper.

In a May 2011 article, cryptographer Nick Szabo stated:

Myself, Wei Dai, and Hal Finney were the only people I know of who liked the idea (or in Dai's case his related idea) enough to pursue it to any significant extent until Nakamoto (assuming Nakamoto is not really Finney or Dai).

However, Dai questions b-money's influence on bitcoin:

...my understanding is that the creator of Bitcoin, who goes by the name Satoshi Nakamoto, didn't even read my article before reinventing the idea himself. He learned about it afterward and credited me in his paper. So my connection with the project is quite limited.

There has been much speculation as to the identity of Satoshi Nakamoto, with candidates including Wei Dai himself, Nick Szabo, and Hal Finney, all of whom have denied the putative identification.
