= Dream Job (disambiguation) =

Dream Job is an American reality television show.

Dream Job may also refer to:

- Dream Job (short film)
- "Dream Job" (Peep Show), an episode of the British television comedy series
- The Dream Job, a Singaporean television drama
