= Peter Todd (programmer) =

Canadian software developer

- Born: Canada
- Education: Ontario College of Art and Design
- Occupation: Software developer
- Known for: Bitcoin development
- Notable work: OpenTimestamps
- Website: https://petertodd.org/

Peter Todd is a Canadian software developer who was an early contributor to the development of Bitcoin. Todd has been involved in cryptocurrency since the early 2010s and has worked on blockchain and privacy-focused projects.

== Biography ==
Peter Todd was born in Canada. When he was 15 years old he began communicating with cypherpunks like Adam Back and Hal Finney. Before his career as a core developer, Peter Todd attended the Ontario College of Art and Design in Toronto.

In 2019, Todd filed a defamation suit against former Tor developer Isis Lovecruft after they publicly accused him of rape and sexual misconduct on Twitter.

== Cryptocurrency involvement ==
In 2014 Todd stated that Gavin Andresen had been responsible for code changes that resulted in Bitcoin's rising fees. In 2017 Todd was against an increase in the Bitcoin block size in relation to the controversy surrounding the Bitcoin scalability problem and SegWit.

The 2024 HBO documentary Money Electric: The Bitcoin Mystery by Cullen Hoback named Todd as Bitcoin's pseudonymous creator, Satoshi Nakamoto. Todd has publicly denied being Nakamoto, stating in the film that it was "ludicrous". Hoback's theory includes a range of circumstantial evidence. In the film, Todd denied that he was Nakamoto, saying that it was "ludicrous" and "grasping at straws". Todd criticized Hoback for "QAnon style coincidence-based conspiracy thinking". No concrete evidence has been presented to support the claim, and the theory remains entirely speculative.
