= Money Electric: The Bitcoin Mystery =

2024 documentary

- Official poster
- Directed by: Cullen Hoback
- Written by: Cullen Hoback
- Produced by: Cullen Hoback; Alina Solodnikova; Jessie Deeter; Scott Holroyd
- Cinematography: Cullen Hoback
- Edited by: Cullen Hoback; Tom Patterson
- Music by: John Morgan Askew
- Production companies: HBO Documentary Films; Hyrax Films; Hyperobject Industries; Hello Pictures
- Distributed by: HBO
- Release date: October 8, 2024
- Running time: 100 minutes
- Country: United States
- Language: English

Money Electric: The Bitcoin Mystery is a 2024 American documentary film, directed and produced by Cullen Hoback. It explores the origins of the cryptocurrency Bitcoin and the identity of its pseudonymous creator Satoshi Nakamoto.

Produced by HBO in association with Hyrax Films and HyperObject Industries, the film was released on October 8, 2024.

== Premise ==
Explores the origins of the cryptocurrency Bitcoin and the identity of its pseudonymous creator Satoshi Nakamoto.

== Synopsis ==
The documentary follows Bitcoin’s early history with Hoback interviewing industry figures including Adam Back, Roger Ver, Peter Todd, Samson Mow, and Amir Taaki, .

Hoback charts Bitcoin’s battle with the US government as its adoption spreads world-wide, as well as how Bitcoin currently matches to its original principles, charting the currency’s evolution from its cypherpunk roots to incorporation into 401(k)s, becoming an integral part of the global financial system.

The documentary proposes a theory that Bitcoin developer Peter Todd may be Satoshi Nakamoto, and both, him and Adam Back were involved in Bitcoin's creation. When confronted with the theory in the film, Todd never outright denies that claim, but calls the theory "ludicrous".

The film notes that days after initially joining the Bitcoin forum in 2010 Todd corrects Nakamoto on a technicality in one of Satoshi's last posts, just an hour after the initial post was made; then disappears online alongside Satoshi. Todd claims a lack of involvement in Bitcoin development until two years later. Hoback raises questions about whether this interaction suggests a deeper involvement much earlier, and whether Todd’s alleged history of using an alternate persona to create a “Replace by Fee” patch, indicates an MO to do the same when creating Bitcoin. Hoback’s theory includes a range of circumstantial evidence including Todd’s alignment with Adam Back and Gregory Maxwell of Blockstream. The theory also connects an alleged 2014 email from Satoshi’s address to Bloclksream's position in the so-called block size war.

The film devotes extensive attention to Adam Back as a Satoshi Nakamoto candidate, with Hoback stating in voice-over "the evidence pointing in Adam's direction was a lot harder to poke holes in". The film notes that Back is named in the body of the Bitcoin white paper, and that Back and Nakamoto have similar a writing style. It also highlights Back's move to Malta, his edits to Wikipedia's Bitcoin article that restored its Satoshi Nakamoto section and listed other suspects but not himself, and his appearance on the Bitcointalk forum on April 17, 2013, the same day the size of Nakamoto holdings first became public. In the documentary interview, after Hoback lists him among the suspects, Back replies, "I thought you might think I'm Satoshi. And I don't want that to be on the record, really". The film characterizes Blockstream, the company Back co-founded in 2014, as a possible "corporate Satoshi".

== Production ==
Following the completion of Q Into the Storm (a docu-series on people behind QAnon conspiracy), Adam McKay asked Cullen Hoback to make a documentary film revolving around Satoshi Nakamoto. Hoback agreed only if they could gain access to suspects, eventually gaining access to Adam Back. Hoback didn't want to bring the project to HBO until he had a working theory.

Hoback traveled extensively to film the documentary.

== Reception ==
The film was widely covered favorably in the press.

Much of the coverage emphasized the credible public interest of Hoback’s journalistic investigation including Satoshi’s identity: noting wallets associated with Satoshi total around 1 million BTC or roughly six percent of total circulation, and presumed to be in his or her control, posing a risk to Bitcoin’s value.

Coverage also cited crypto's powerful D.C. lobby, its impact on global economic policy, and the potential role its investors could play the 2024 U.S. Presidential election.

Coverage states that if Satoshi offloaded their stash, it could be “disastrous” for Bitcoin’s price and that Bitcoin’s stability relies on the “assumption that Satoshi and his coins are gone forever,” citing Coinbase SEC filings which state that “public identification of Satoshi was an outstanding risk.”

It was said that the Bitcoin community is incentivized to keep Satoshi anonymous, but commentators emphasized there could be concern for any public figures who became suspects including from the unwanted invasion of their privacy.

Hoback’s investigation and others were also likened to Gen Z’s version of “Who killed Jimmy Hoffa” and “What Happened to D.B. Cooper?”

In April 2026, The New York Times published an investigation that also named Adam Back as its leading Satoshi Nakamoto candidate.

== Responses from Subjects ==
Adam Back denied being Satoshi Nakamoto during the film. He later commented favorably on the documentary overall, stating on X that it accurately explained Bitcoin to a general audience.

Peter Todd does not outright deny being Satohi Nakamoto in the film, but calls the theory "ludicrous." After the film's release, Todd denied the claim and criticized Hoback, describing the film's theory as "coincidence-based conspiracy thinking". In late October 2024, Wired reported that Todd had gone into hiding. The next day Todd retweeted an image of him giving a presentation at a conference, saying Wired's claim was an exaggeration.

Hoback has said the film does not contain definitive proof of Nakamoto's identity, but "present[s] a hell of a case", and that viewers should draw their own conclusions.
