= Phil Champagne =

Canadian technology writer

Phil Champagne is a Canadian technology writer specialising in bitcoin, best known for his book The Book of Satoshi: The Collected Writings of Bitcoin Creator Satoshi Nakamoto (2014) about Satoshi Nakamoto. He is a graduate of the Université de Sherbrooke.
