= Satoshi Nakamoto =

Pseudonym of the creator of Bitcoin

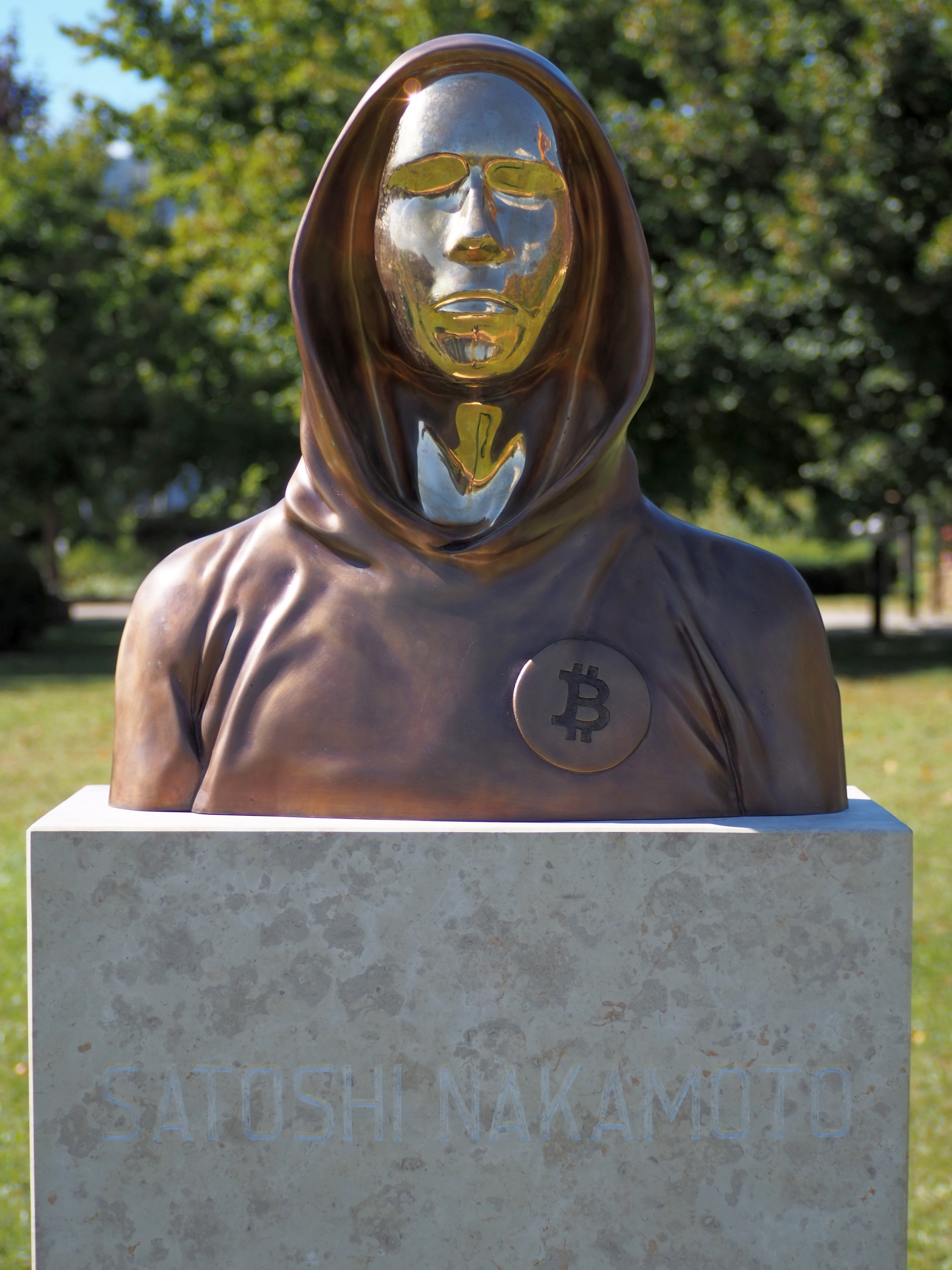
- A statue in Budapest dedicated to Satoshi Nakamoto
- Known for: Inventing bitcoin; implementing the first blockchain
- Scientific career
- Fields: Digital currencies; computer science; cryptography

Satoshi Nakamoto (fl. 31 October 2008 – 26 April 2011) is the name used by the presumed pseudonymous person(s) who developed bitcoin, authored the bitcoin white paper, and created and deployed bitcoin's original reference implementation. As part of the implementation, Nakamoto also devised the first blockchain database. Nakamoto was active in the development of bitcoin until December 2010.

Nakamoto's true identity is unknown. Various people have been posited as the person or group of people behind his name. He used a Japanese name and gave his residence as Japan, but many have speculated that he is actually a British software and cryptography expert who worked on bitcoin in the United Kingdom. If Nakamoto is an individual person, then his bitcoin holdings make him one of the wealthiest people in the world. His wallet, which has been untouched since 2010, holds an estimated 1.1 million bitcoins. As of 14 July 2025, their price was more than $123,000 each, meaning the contents of Nakamoto's wallet would have been worth nearly $135 billion.

== Development of bitcoin ==
Satoshi Nakamoto message embedded in the coinbase of the first block

Nakamoto said that the work of writing bitcoin's code began in the second quarter of 2007. On 18 August 2008, he registered the domain name bitcoin.org, and created a web site at that address. On 31 October, Nakamoto published a white paper on the cryptography mailing list at metzdowd.com describing a digital cryptocurrency, titled "Bitcoin: A Peer-to-Peer Electronic Cash System".

On 9 January 2009, Nakamoto released version 0.1 of the bitcoin software on SourceForge and launched the network by defining the genesis block of bitcoin (block number 0), which had a reward of 50 bitcoins. Embedded in the coinbase transaction of this block is the text: "The Times 03/Jan/2009 Chancellor on brink of second bailout for banks", citing a headline in the UK newspaper The Times published on that date. This note has been interpreted as both a timestamp and a derisive comment on the alleged instability caused by fractional-reserve banking.

Nakamoto continued to collaborate with other developers on bitcoin's software, making all modifications to the source code himself until mid-2010. He then gave control of the source code repository and network alert key to Gavin Andresen, and transferred several related domains to various prominent members of the bitcoin community. In 2011, Nakamoto wrote in an email to co-developer Mike Hearn that he had “moved on to other things,” and he was never heard from again.

As of 2021, Nakamoto is estimated to own between 750,000 and 1,100,000 bitcoin. In November 2021, when bitcoin reached a value of over $68,000, his net worth would have been up to $73 billion, making him the 15th-richest person in the world at the time.

== Characteristics and identity ==
Nakamoto has never revealed personal information when discussing technical matters. On his P2P Foundation profile as of 2012, he claimed to be a 37-year-old man who lived in Japan, and gave his date of birth as 5 April 1975. Some theorize that the date referenced the signing of Executive Order 6102, which prohibited the ownership of gold coins in the United States, and 1975 as the year it was repealed. Author Dominic Frisby categorized the date as an "obscure but brilliant reference" and as "extremely political".

It is speculated Nakamoto is unlikely to be Japanese due to their native-level use of English. The bitcoin white paper was not initially translated into Japanese. Analysis of the time of his posts indicates activity aligning with a western time zone. Stefan Thomas, a Swiss software engineer and active community member, graphed the timestamps of each of Nakamoto's bitcoin forum posts (more than 500); the chart showed a steep decline to almost none between 5 a.m. and 11 a.m. Greenwich Mean Time (midnight to 6 a.m. Eastern Standard Time). This was between 2 p.m. and 8 p.m. Japan Standard Time, suggesting an unusual sleep pattern for someone living in Japan. As this pattern held even on Saturdays and Sundays, it suggested that Nakamoto was consistently asleep at this time.

Others have considered that Nakamoto might be a team of people. Dan Kaminsky, a security researcher who read bitcoin's code, said that Nakamoto was either a "team of people" or a "genius"; Laszlo Hanyecz, a developer who had emailed Nakamoto, had the feeling the code was too well-designed for one person; Andresen has said of Nakamoto's code: "He was a brilliant coder, but it was quirky."

The use of British English and slang in both source code comments and forum postings, such as the expressions "bloody hard", "lad" and "mate" as well as terms such as "flat" and "maths", and the spellings "grey" and "colour", as well as double-spaced sentences led to speculation that Nakamoto is British, or a citizen of a Commonwealth nation. The incorporation of text in the first bitcoin block from the headline of an article on the front page of the British national newspaper The Times on the same day suggests he was located in the UK.

In June 2016, the London Review of Books published a piece by Andrew O'Hagan about Nakamoto.

=== Possible identities ===
Nakamoto's identity is unknown, but speculations have focused on various cryptography and computer science experts, most of whom are of non-Japanese descent. Bitcoiners and cryptographers have suggested various methods by which a person could prove their identity as Nakamoto, such as moving the earliest bitcoins mined or signing a message with the key associated with the first bitcoins. On the other hand, a denial of being Nakamoto is very difficult to confirm.

==== Adam Back ====
In 2016, the Financial Times said that Nakamoto might have been a group of people, mentioning Adam Back, Hal Finney, and Nick Szabo as potential members. In 2018, John McAfee publicly suggested that Adam Back was the creator of bitcoin. In 2020, the YouTube channel Barely Sociable claimed that Back, inventor of bitcoin predecessor Hashcash, is Nakamoto; widespread discussion ensued and Back subsequently denied this.

In 2024, the film Money Electric: The Bitcoin Mystery devotes attention to Back as a Satoshi Nakamoto candidate. The film notes that Back is named in the body of the Bitcoin white paper, and that Back and Nakamoto have a similar writing style. It also highlights Back's move to Malta, his edits to Wikipedia's Bitcoin article that restored its Satoshi Nakamoto section and listed other suspects but not himself, and his appearance on the Bitcointalk forum on 17 April 2013, the same day the size of Nakamoto holdings first became public. The film characterizes Blockstream, the company Back co-founded in 2014, as a possible "corporate Satoshi". In the documentary, Back says "I thought you might think I'm Satoshi. And I don't want that to be on the record, really".

In 2026, investigative journalist John Carreyrou of The New York Times reported on a series of interactions with Adam Back, suggesting he could be Satoshi Nakamoto. Carreyrou cited Back's cryptographic background, his prior work on Hashcash, and stylometric analyses comparing Back's writing to Nakamoto's. He also noted circumstantial factors, including Back's reduced activity on cryptography mailing lists during the period Nakamoto was active and perceived inconsistencies in Back's recollections of early bitcoin discussions. During an in-person interview at a bitcoin conference in El Salvador, Back denied being Nakamoto multiple times and attributed the evidence to coincidence. Carreyrou interpreted aspects of Back's responses and demeanor, including a disputed conversational remark, as potentially indicative of authorship. Back rejected this interpretation.

==== Hal Finney ====
Hal Finney (4 May 1956 – 28 August 2014) was a pre-bitcoin cryptographic pioneer and the first person (other than Nakamoto himself) to use the software, file bug reports, and make improvements. His home in Temple City, California, was also a few blocks from a programmer named Dorian Satoshi Nakamoto, according to Forbes journalist Andy Greenberg. Greenberg asked the writing analysis consultancy Juola & Associates to compare a sample of Finney's writing to Nakamoto's, and found it to be the closest resemblance they had yet come across, including when compared to candidates suggested by Newsweek, Fast Company, The New Yorker, Ted Nelson, and Skye Grey. Greenberg theorized that Finney may have been a ghost writer on Nakamoto's behalf, or that he simply used his neighbour's identity as a "drop" or "patsy whose personal information is used to hide online exploits"; but after meeting Finney, seeing the emails between him and Nakamoto and his bitcoin wallet's history (including the first transaction from Nakamoto to him, which he forgot to pay back) and hearing his denial, Greenberg concluded that Finney was telling the truth. Juola & Associates also found that Nakamoto's emails to Finney more closely resemble Nakamoto's other writings than Finney's do. Finney also denied knowing Dorian Nakamoto, who was himself named by Newsweek as a likely candidate for the creator of bitcoin.

It has also been proposed that Nakamoto was a partnership between Finney and Len Sassaman (see other candidates, below).

==== Dorian Nakamoto ====
In a high-profile March 2014 article in Newsweek, journalist Leah McGrath Goodman doxed Dorian Prentice Satoshi Nakamoto, a Japanese-American man living in California, whose birth name is Satoshi Nakamoto, as the Nakamoto in question. Her methods and conclusion drew widespread criticism.

Besides the man's name, Goodman pointed to a number of facts that circumstantially suggested he was the bitcoin inventor. Trained as a physicist at California State Polytechnic University, Pomona, Nakamoto worked as a systems engineer on classified defence projects and as a computer engineer for technology and financial information services companies. According to his daughter, Nakamoto was laid off twice in the early 1990s, turned libertarian, and encouraged her to start her own business "not under the government's thumb". Seemingly the article's biggest piece of evidence was that when Goodman asked him about bitcoin during a brief in-person interview, Nakamoto seemed to confirm his identity as its founder, saying: "I am no longer involved in that and I cannot discuss it. It's been turned over to other people. They are in charge of it now. I no longer have any connection."

The article's publication led to a flurry of media interest, including reporters camping out near Nakamoto's house and chasing him by car when he drove to an interview. Later that day, the pseudonymous Nakamoto's P2P Foundation account posted its first message in five years: "I am not Dorian Nakamoto." In a subsequent interview with the Associated Press, also published later that same day, Nakamoto denied all connection to bitcoin, saying he had never heard of it before being contacted by reporters three weeks prior, and that he had misinterpreted Goodman's question as being about his previous work for military contractors, much of which was classified. The AP noted that Dorian Nakamoto "speaks both English and Japanese, but his English isn’t flawless." Of the representation of his conversation with Goodman in the Newsweek article, Nakamoto said "I’m saying I’m no longer in engineering. That’s it. [...] It sounded like I was involved before with bitcoin and looked like I’m not involved now. That’s not what I meant. I want to clarify that".

That September, the P2P Foundation account posted another message saying it had been hacked, raising questions over the authenticity of the message six months earlier.

==== Nick Szabo ====
In December 2013, blogger Skye Grey linked Nick Szabo to the bitcoin white paper using stylometric analysis. Szabo is a decentralized-currency enthusiast and published a paper on "bit gold", one of bitcoin's precursors. He is known to have been interested in using pseudonyms in the 1990s. In May 2009, he wrote a blogpost about bitcoin and Satoshi Nakamoto. In a May 2011 article, Szabo said of bitcoin's creator: "Myself, Wei Dai, and Hal Finney were the only people I know of who liked the idea (or in Dai's case his related idea) enough to pursue it to any significant extent until Nakamoto (assuming Nakamoto is not really Finney or Dai)."

Financial author Dominic Frisby provides much circumstantial evidence but, as he admits, no proof that Nakamoto is Szabo. Szabo denied being Satoshi, and stated his official opinion on Satoshi and bitcoin in a May 2011 article. In a July 2014 email to Frisby, he wrote: "Thanks for letting me know. I'm afraid you got it wrong doxing me as Satoshi, but I'm used to it." In 2015, Nathaniel Popper wrote in The New York Times that "the most convincing evidence pointed to a reclusive American man of Hungarian descent named Nick Szabo."

==== Craig Wright ====
On 8 December 2015, Wired wrote that Craig Steven Wright, an Australian academic, "either invented bitcoin or is a brilliant hoaxer who very badly wants us to believe he did". Wright took down his Twitter account and neither he nor his ex-wife responded to press inquiries. The same day, Gizmodo published a story with evidence supposedly obtained by a hacker who broke into Wright's email accounts, claiming that Satoshi Nakamoto was a joint pseudonym for Wright and computer forensics analyst Dave Kleiman, who died in 2013. Wright's claim was supported by Andresen and former Bitcoin Foundation director Jon Matonis.

Wright has said that he chose the name "Nakamoto" in honour of Japanese philosopher Tominaga Nakamoto, whom Wright learned about from his Japanese martial arts instructor, and "Satoshi" after the Pokémon character Satoshi, because his name was anglicized as "Ash", and thus "Satoshi" represents the current financial system that must be burned into ash to make way for cryptocurrency.

Many prominent bitcoin promoters remained unconvinced by the reports. Subsequent reports also raised the possibility that the evidence provided was an elaborate hoax, which Wired acknowledged "cast doubt" on its suggestion that Wright was Nakamoto. Bitcoin developer Peter Todd said that Wright's blog post, which appeared to contain cryptographic proof, actually contained nothing of the sort. Bitcoin developer Jeff Garzik agreed that the evidence Wright publicly provided proves nothing, and security researcher Dan Kaminsky concluded Wright's claim was "intentional scammery".

In May 2019, Wright started using English libel law to sue people who denied he was bitcoin's inventor and called him a fraud. In 2019, Wright registered US copyright for the bitcoin white paper and the code for bitcoin 0.1. Wright's team claimed this was "government agency recognition of Craig Wright as Satoshi Nakamoto"; the United States Copyright Office issued a press release clarifying that this was not the case (as they primarily determine whether a work is eligible for copyright, and do not investigate legal ownership, which, if disputed, is determined by the courts).

In March 2024, in the Crypto Open Patents Association (COPA) case before the High Court, Judge James Mellor ruled that Wright was not Satoshi Nakamoto.

First, that Dr. Wright is not the author of the Bitcoin white paper. Second, Dr. Wright is not the person who adopted or operated under the pseudonym Satoshi Nakamoto in the period 2008 to 2011. Third, Dr. Wright is not the person who created the Bitcoin system. And, fourth, he is not the author of the initial versions of the Bitcoin software.

— Judge James Mellor UK High Court 2024

The written judgment released on 20 May 2024, stated that documents submitted as evidence substantiate Wright's claim to be Satoshi were forgeries, and Dr Wright had "lied to the court extensively and repeatedly". On 19 December 2024, Wright was sentenced in the UK to one year in prison, suspended for two years, for contempt of court in relation to Wright's £911 billion lawsuit against Jack Dorsey's company Block, Inc.

==== Other candidates ====
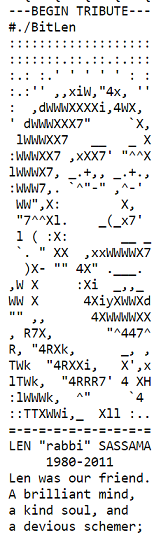
Len Sassaman memorial on the bitcoin blockchain

Vili Lehdonvirta and Michael Clear – In 2011, The New Yorker claimed to have narrowed down Nakamoto's identity to a few people, including the Finnish economic sociologist Vili Lehdonvirta and Irish student Michael Clear, who, in 2008, was an undergraduate student in cryptography at Trinity College Dublin. Each of them strongly denied being Nakamoto.

Neal King, Vladimir Oksman and Charles Bry – In 2011, writing for Fast Company, investigative journalist Adam Penenberg cited circumstantial evidence linking an encryption patent application filed by Neal King, Vladimir Oksman and Charles Bry on 15 August 2008 and the bitcoin white paper by Nakamoto. The patent application contained networking and encryption technologies similar to bitcoin's and contained the phrase "computationally impractical to reverse", which was also used in the bitcoin white paper. The bitcoin.org domain name was registered three days after the patent was filed. All three explicitly denied being Nakamoto when contacted by Penenberg.

Shinichi Mochizuki – In 2013, Ted Nelson speculated that Nakamoto was Japanese mathematician Shinichi Mochizuki. The Age newspaper reported that Mochizuki had denied these speculations.

Gavin Andresen and Jed McCaleb – In 2013, Vice listed Gavin Andresen, Jed McCaleb, or a government agency as possible candidates to be Nakamoto.

Ross Ulbricht – In 2013, two Israeli mathematicians, Dorit Ron and Adi Shamir, published a paper claiming a link between Nakamoto and Ross Ulbricht, basing their suspicion on an analysis of the network of bitcoin transactions. These allegations were contested, and Ron and Shamir later retracted their claim.

European computer collective – In 2013, the possibility that "Satoshi Nakamoto" was a computer collective in the European financial sector has also been discussed.

Elon Musk – In 2017, a Medium post by Sahil Gupta, a former SpaceX intern said Elon Musk was probably Nakamoto; Musk denied this in a tweet a few days later.

Paul Le Roux – In 2019, journalist Evan Ratliff claimed cartel boss and encryption programmer Paul Le Roux could be Nakamoto.

Len Sassaman – In 2021, developer Evan Hatch proposed cypherpunk Len Sassaman (1980–2011) of COSIC as a possible candidate. Sassaman had been mentioned on bitcointalk on 15 March 2013 when a user suggested Sassaman was Satoshi. A presentation given by Kaminsky at the 2011 Black Hat Briefings revealed that a testimonial in honour of Sassaman had been permanently embedded into bitcoin's blockchain. Ecash creator David Chaum was Sassaman's graduate teacher. A documentary in 2026 named "Finding Satoshi" proposed that Nakomoto was a partnership between Sassaman and Hal Finney.

David Chaum – In 2023, CoinMarketCap suggested that cryptographer David Chaum could be Nakamoto as he was one of the earliest cypherpunks, created Ecash, and described a prototype version of the blockchain in his thesis. However, they wrote that this evidence is circumstantial and not direct.

Peter Todd – In 2024, an HBO documentary directed by Cullen Hoback titled Money Electric: The Bitcoin Mystery named former bitcoin developer Peter Todd as allegedly being Satoshi Nakamoto. Hoback's claim relies on a chat message written by Todd where he commented on a technicality in one of Satoshi's last posts, shortly after Todd had created his personal account, and just an hour after the initial post was made. Hoback also notes Nakamoto's use of Canadian English, as well as a subsequent chat post by Todd where he rued being "the world's leading expert on how to sacrifice your bitcoins [...] I've done one such sacrifice and I did it by hand." Hoback characterized the latter as an admission by Todd of having destroyed access to the bitcoin believed to be held by Nakamoto. Todd denied that he was Nakamoto, stating that it was "ludicrous" and "grasping at straws", and criticized Hoback by saying that it was "ironic that a director who is also known for a documentary on QAnon has resorted to QAnon style coincidence-based conspiracy thinking here too".

== In popular culture ==
A bust dedicated to Satoshi Nakamoto was installed in Budapest, Hungary, in 2021.

A statue of Satoshi Nakamoto by Valentina Picozzi was unveiled in Lugano, Switzerland, designed to appear differently from different angles. It was stolen and thrown into the lake but recovered.

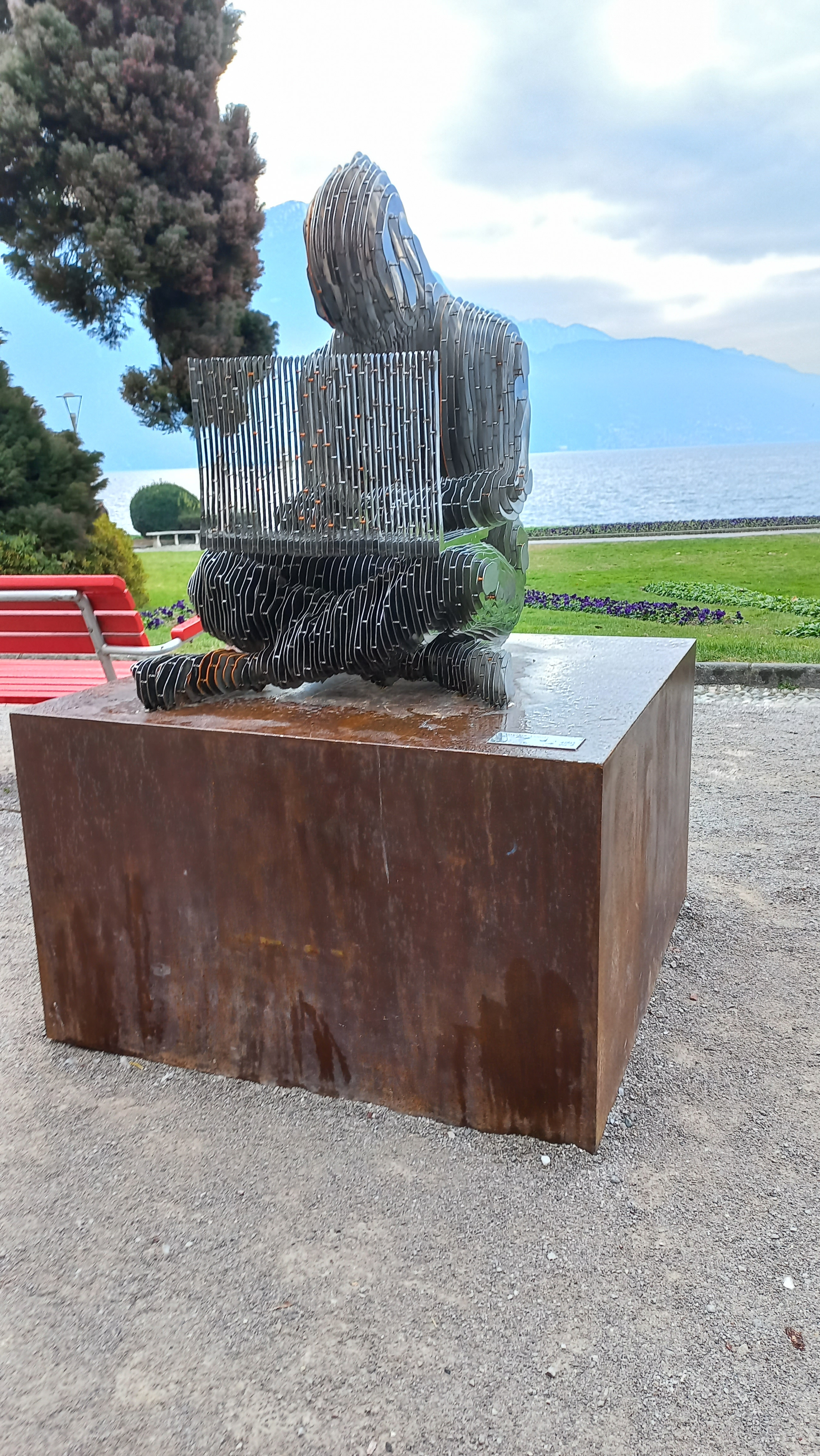
Statue of Satoshi Nakamoto at Lake Lugano

View where Nakamoto disappears
