= Blockstream =

Blockchain technology company

- Official Blockstream logo
- Type: Corporation
- Industry: Cryptocurrency software
- Founded: 2014
- Founders: Adam Back; Gregory Maxwell; Pieter Wuille; Matt Corallo; Mark Friedenbach; Jorge Timón; Austin Hill; Jonathan Wilkins; Francesca Hall; Alex Fowler
- Headquarters: Menlo Park, California, Canada
- Key people: Adam Back (CEO)
- ASN: 396997
- Website: blockstream.com

Blockstream is a blockchain technology company co-founded by Adam Back in 2014. The company develops infrastructure for the Bitcoin network, including sidechains, privacy enhancements, and tools for both institutional and consumer use. It is known for its contributions to Bitcoin protocol development and its suite of Bitcoin-native financial products and services. Blockstream is headquartered in Menlo Park, California, with additional offices in Lugano and Tokyo.

The company raised $210 million in a Series B round in August 2021, reaching a $3.2 billion valuation, from investors including venture capital firms Horizons Ventures and AXA Strategic Ventures. In October 2024, Blockstream raised an additional $210 million through a convertible note offering led by Fulgur Ventures, with funds earmarked for expanding its layer-2 technologies, mining operations, and bitcoin treasury.

In July 2026, Blockstream and Cantor Fitzgerald, citing "current market conditions", cancelled a widely publicized SPAC merger that would have seen Blockstream listed on the Nasdaq exchange.

== History ==
Blockstream was founded in 2014 by cryptographer Adam Back, along with Bitcoin developers and cryptographers including Pieter Wuille and Gregory Maxwell. Blockstream developer Rusty Russell was one of the first developers to try implementing the Lightning Network during the summer of 2015.

Blockstream raised $21 million in seed funding in 2014.

In early 2018 Blockstream announced a partnership with Intercontinental Exchange Inc. (ICE) to launch a cryptocurrency market data feed.

== Products ==
=== The Liquid Network ===
On October 12, 2015, Blockstream announced the release of its Liquid sidechain prototype which could allow for the transfer of assets between the Liquid sidechain and the bitcoin main blockchain. On October 11, 2018, a production-ready implementation of the Liquid sidechain was officially launched, called the Liquid Network, which is designed to facilitate interoperability between the bitcoin main chain and the Liquid sidechain to extend bitcoin's capabilities.

Blockstream claims that Liquid reduces the delays and friction involved in a normal transfer of bitcoin. Blockstream asserts participating exchanges–including Bitfinex, BitMEX and OKCoin–can reduce counterparty risk for traders and enable near-instant financial transactions between their platform and other exchanges or a trader's wallet(s). New blocks are added to the Liquid sidechain every minute, as opposed to bitcoin's 10-minute block interval.

=== Blockstream Satellite ===
In 2017 Blockstream announced the availability of one-way satellite broadcasting of the full bitcoin blockchain. In 2018 Blockstream extended the bitcoin satellite network.
