= Wanjiru Kamau-Rutenberg =

Kenyan political scientist (born 1978)

Wanjirū Kamau-Rutenberg
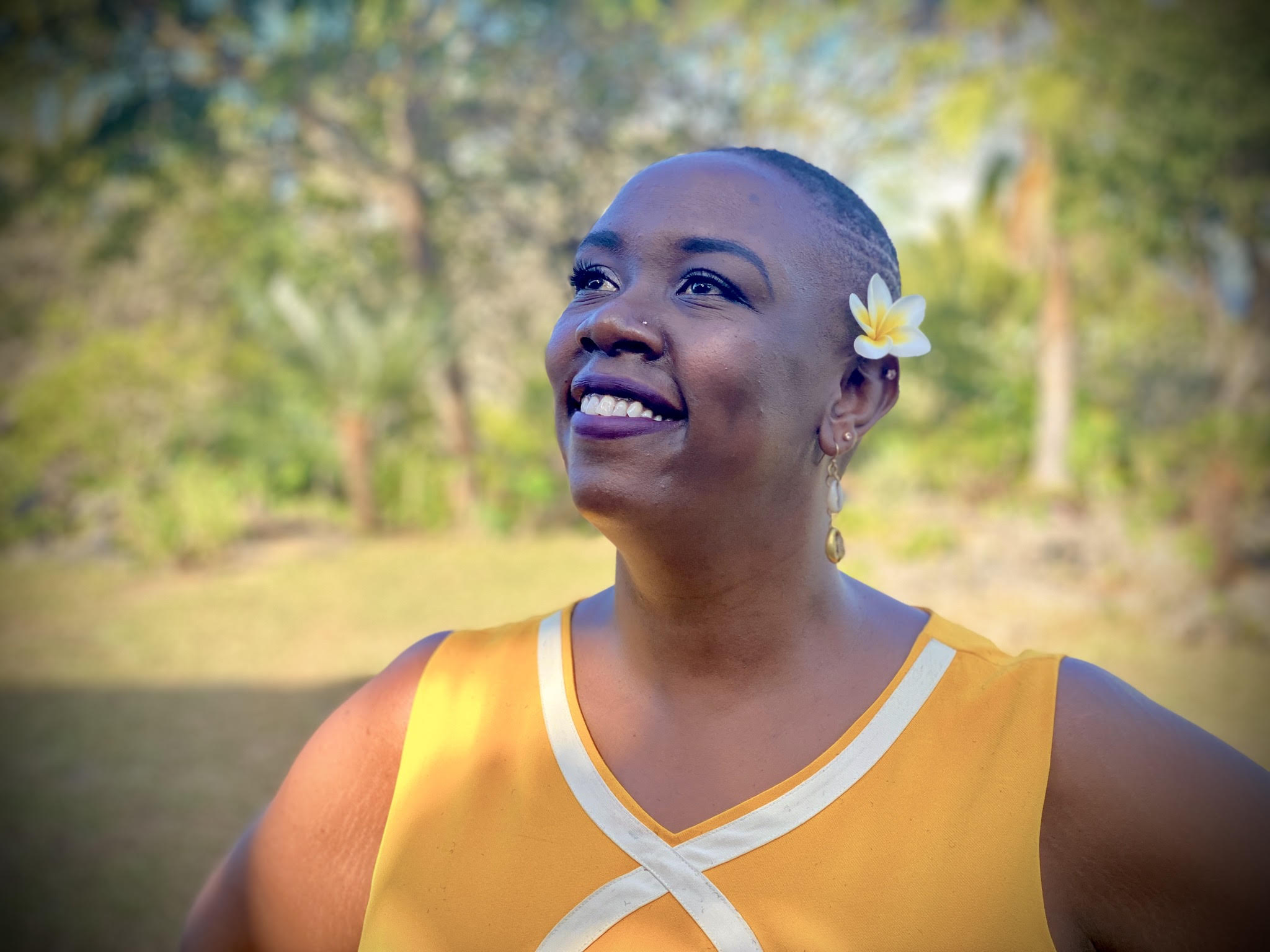
- Born: Kenya
- Education: University of Minnesota; Whitman College
- Title: Managing Director for Africa, Alliance of Bioversity International and CIAT
- Spouse: Isaac Rutenberg

Wanjirū Kamau-Rutenbergis a Kenyan executive, organisational founder and former academic whose work spans international development, agricultural research, philanthropy and women's leadership. She serves as Managing Director for Africa at The Alliance of Bioversity International and CIAT. She previously served as a Senior Fellow at the Ford Foundation, Executive-In-Residence at Schmidt Futures, inaugural Executive Director of the Rise program, a joint initiative of Schmidt Futures and the Rhodes Trust, and Director of African Women in Agricultural Research and Development (AWARD).

Wanjiru is also the founder and former Executive Director of Akili Dada, a leadership incubator for African girls and young women, and the founder of Black Women in Executive Leadership (B-WEL).

== Education ==
Kamau-Rutenberg earned a Ph.D in Political Science from the University of Minnesota, Minneapolis, where she concentrated on International Relations, Gender Studies & African History. Her 2008 dissertation on the Impact of Ethnic Politics on Women’s Rights legislation during Kenya’s Democratic Transition theorized about the intersection of gender, (re)production of ethnic identities and democratization processes in emerging economies. Her essay using a gender lens to explore forced circumcision of men during Kenya's 2007-08 Post Election ethnic violence was one of the first of its kind to use African men's experiences of political violence as a point of departure to theorize the intersection of gender and politics and was published in the Oxford University Transitional Justice Research Working Paper Series.

She was also awarded a Doctorate of Humane Letters (Honoris Causa) by Whitman College, Washington. This Honorary Doctorate recognized her scholarly work and activism towards gender equality especially in Africa. She delivered the commencement speech to the graduating class of 2017 as part of the award ceremony.

Kamau-Rutenberg also holds a Master of Arts degree in political science from the University of Minnesota, Minneapolis awarded in 2005, and a Bachelor of Arts in Politics from Whitman College, Walla Walla, Washington awarded in 2001.

== Career ==
In 2005, Kamau-Rutenberg founded Akili Dada, a leadership incubator for girls and young women based in Nairobi, Kenya to address the underrepresentation of women in leadership positions in Africa. She served as its Executive Director until her transition to African Women in Agricultural Research and Development (AWARD) in 2014.

Alongside her work at Akili Dada, Wanjiru pursued an academic career. She served as an as an Assistant Professor at the University of San Francisco, San Francisco, California from 2008 to 2014, where her teaching and research focused on African politics, international relations, gender, philanthropy, ethnicity and democratization. She also lectured in International Relations at Hekima University College, in Nairobi, a constituent college of the Catholic University of Eastern Africa, between 2013 and 2014.

In March 2014, Kamau-Rutenberg became Director of African Women in Agricultural Research and Development (AWARD), a programme hosted by the World Agroforestry Centre (ICRAF) in Nairobi. AWARD invests in agricultural scientists, research institutions, and agribusinesses, strengthening their ability to deliver gender-responsive agricultural innovation for inclusive, agriculture-driven prosperity across Africa. During her tenure, AWARD announced the One Planet Fellowship in December 2017, a $20M, 5 year initiative to invest in the careers of 600 scientists working towards research to help African smallholder farmers adapt towards a changing climate.

Following her departure from AWARD, Wanjiru became the inaugural Executive Director of Rise, a global talent development initiative established jointly by Schmidt Futures and the Rhodes Trust. She subsequently served as Executive in Residence at Schmidt Futures, where her work included initiatives relating to leadership development and social inclusion.

Wanjiru later founded Black Women in Executive Leadership (B-WEL), an initiative supporting Black women in senior and executive leadership positions across sectors. She served as its inaugural Executive Director. The initiative focuses on leadership development, professional networks and addressing barriers affecting Black women's participation and influence in executive leadership.

In February 2024, the Ford Foundation announced Wanjiru's appointment as a Senior Fellow. Her fellowship included supporting the development of B-WEL and contributing to the foundation's work on gender, racial and ethnic justice.

In December 2024, Kamau-Rutenberg was appointed Managing Director for Africa at the Alliance of Bioversity International and CIAT. In this role, she oversees the Alliance's regional research and institutional activities, including work on sustainable agricultural development, biodiversity, climate resilience and food systems across Africa. She also serves as a trustee of Bioversity International USA.

=== Board Roles ===
Wanjiru has served, and continues to serve, on numerous boards and advisory bodies. Since 2023, she has served on the Boards of the Autodesk Foundation and the Global FoodBanking Network. In 2024, she was appointed a trustee of Bioversity International USA. She also serves on the International Advisory Board of the Center for Development Research (ZEF) at the University of Bonn, a position she has held since 2019.

In 2021, she was appointed to the Board of Landesa, where she served until 2023, and the Board of the Syngenta Foundation, where she served until 2024. She previously served on the Board of the Wangari Maathai Foundation (2018 - 2022), the Board of Twaweza (2016 - 2023), and the Executive Board of the Global Crop Diversity Trust (2024).

Wanjiru also served on the President's Advisory Board of Whitman College (2018 - 2024), the Council of the African Climate Foundation (2020 - 2024), and the Advisory Board of the Co-Impact Gender Fund (2021 - 2025).

She was a member of the Selection Committee of the Africa Food Prize from 2018 to 2025 and the Malabo Montpellier Panel from 2017 - 2025, a high-level panel of independent experts that provided policy recommendations to African governments and civil society on agriculture, food security and nutrition across the continent.

== Awards and honors ==
- 2003: MacArthur Doctoral Fellow], Interdisciplinary Program on Global Change, Sustainability and Justice, Doctoral Research Fellowship, University of Minnesota
- 2009: Pete Reid Award for Young Alumni, Whitman College, Washington, United States
- 2010: Winner, Marketplace of Ideas, United Nations Alliance of Civilizations, Rio de Janeiro, Brazil
- 2011: Thomas I. Yamashita Prize, Center for the Study of Social Change, University of California at Berkeley
- 2012: 100 Most Influential Africans, New African Magazine
- 2012: Champion of Democracy] in East Africa, Ford Foundation
- 2012: White House Champion of Change, United States White House and the United States Department of State
- 2013: Africa's Most Influential Women in Business and Government, Winner, Civil Society category, Nairobi.
- 2014: Top 40 women under age 40, Business Daily, Nairobi, Kenya.
- 2016: Africa's Most Influential Women, New African Magazine, London, U.K
- 2017: Doctor of Humane Letters (Honoris Causa), Whitman College, WA USA
- 2018: Archbishop Desmond Tutu Leadership Fellow, African Leadership Institute, Oxford University, & Cape Town, South Africa
- 2018: 20 Faces of Science, Africa Science Week, Kenya
- 2021: 100 Most Influential African Women, Avance Media
- 2021: 27 Inspiring Women Reshaping the Food System
- 2021: 100 Most Influential Women in Gender Policy, Apolitical
- 2023: 100 Most Reputable Africans, Reputation Poll International
- 2024: Alumni of Notable Achievement, College of Liberal Arts, University of Minnesota
- 2026: Top Agri-food Pioneer, World Food Prize Foundation

== Bibliography ==
=== Book and journal contributions ===
- Mbo'o-Tchouawou, Michèle; Mulei Musembi, Leornard; Bayene, Hailemichael & Kamau Rutenberg, Wanjiru (30 November 2019). "Chapter 3:Gender and Leadership in Africa: Exploring The Nexus, Trends, and Opportunities" (PDF). In R. Quisumbing, Agnes & Meinzen-Dick, Ruth Suseela (eds.). 2019 Annual trends and outlook report: Gender equality in rural Africa: From commitments to outcomes. International Food Policy Research Institute. pp. 32–43. ISBN 978-0-89629-364-9.
- Nkwake AM, Kamau-Rutenberg W, Mentz M (2017). "Catalyzing and Measuring Women Leadership and Empowerment in African Agricultural Research and Development". Journal of Gender, Agriculture and Food Security. 2 (1).
- Kamau-Rutenberg, Wanjiru (17 July 2009). "Watu Wazima: A gender analysis of forced male circumcisions during Kenya's post-election violence". online: African Arguments.
- Kamau, C. W. (March 2006). "Kenya & the War on Terrorism". Review of African Political Economy. 33 (107): 133–141. JSTOR 4007116.

=== Op-eds ===
- Kamau-Rutenberg, Wanjiru (8 March 2020). "Ending global hunger requires tackling gender inequality". CNBC Africa. Archived from the original on 9 October 2020.
- Kamau-Rutenberg, Wanjiru (April 2018). "Gender equality in African agriculture: An innovation imperative". WIPO Magazine.
- Kamau-Rutenberg, Wanjiru (12 April 2018). "Guest Commentary - Want to Make Agriculture Attractive for Africa's Youth? More Bitumen Please". online: The Chicago Council on Global Affairs. Archived from the original on 19 November 2020.
- Kamau-Rutenberg, Wanjiru (9 February 2018). "The Path to Empowering Women in Agricultural Science". Farming First. Archived from the original on 28 November 2020.
- Kamau-Rutenberg, Wanjiru (4 November 2015). "Cultivating More Female Plant Scientists". CropLife International. Archived from the original on 13 March 2016.
