= Miko Lim =

American director and photographer (born 1980)

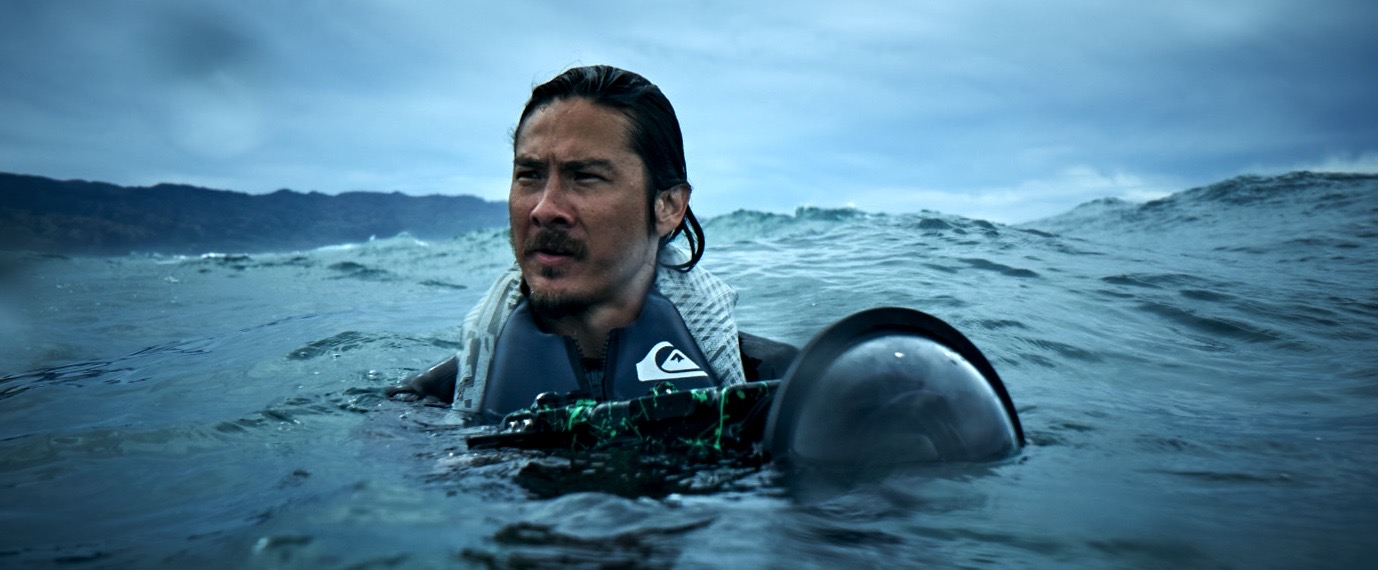
- Lim in 2021
- Born: January 6, 1980 (age 46); Tawau, Malaysia
- Education: Pomona College
- Occupations: Director, photographer
- Years active: 2006-present
- Website: mikolim.com

Miko Lim is an American film director and photographer. Lim wrote, produced, and directed the 2026 IMAX documentary film Stormbound, which premiered at SXSW and won the Special Jury Award for Best Feature Documentary. He is also known for directing commercials for Adidas, Nike, and Oakley with athletes including Patrick Mahomes, Leo Messi, and Kevin Durant. His work has been recognized by major film festivals, including Cannes and the International Muse Creative Awards. For his work on Ocean Mother, a documentary short, he received a Clio Award and a Telly Award for Best Director, as well as other film festival awards.

== Biography ==
Lim was born in Tawau, Malaysia, and was raised in Seattle, Washington, where he attended Garfield High School. After completing his education at Pomona College in Claremont, California, he developed his photography and filmmaking work while living in New York, Paris, and Tokyo. Lim is an active member of the climbing and outdoors community.

== Career ==
In 2026, Lim directed Stormbound, which premiered at the SXSW Film Festival in the Worldwide Documentary Competition. Shot in IMAX and produced with Adam McKay, the film follows stormchaser Jeff Gammons battle health issues while photographing the world's largest hurricanes and tornadoes. The film won the Special Jury Award for Best Feature Documentary.

Lim is a Paramount Global Director Fellow, and a co-chair of the DGA's first feature film mentorship program.

Lim has directed and photographed numerous advertising campaigns for Nike, Adidas, Puma, and Mountain Dew, among many others. His major advertising work began with Champion's How You Play campaign working with advertising agency Kaplan Thaler Group. Lim has shot numerous covers for ESPN Magazine, Outside, GQ, Rolling Stone, and Vogue. In 2025, Lim founded the production company Anagram Pictures.

Lim has filmed many celebrities and professional athletes, including Jay-Z, Michael Jordan, Leo Messi, Russell Westbrook, Patrick Mahomes, Diplo, Lil Wayne, Wiz Khalifa, Anthony Davis, Paul Pogba, Kevin Jorgeson, Joel Embiid, Von Miller, JuJu Smith-Schuster, and Nina Williams.

In 2010, Lim created and published his first photobook, We Are The Only Ones, after visiting The Raleigh Hotel in Miami, Florida before it was shut down.
