= List of most-watched Netflix original programming =

This is a list of most-watched Netflix original programming of all time in number of views, that equate to hours viewed per length of particular content, rounded to the nearest hundred thousand. These statistics are released by Netflix based on its proprietary engagement metrics. As the viewership is measured only during the first 91 days after release, increased from 28 days since 2023, it differs from the numbers combined in the What We Watched reports.

== Films ==
Most popular Netflix movies by views
Rank	Title	Genre	Release date	Views (millions)	Hours watched (millions)
1	KPop Demon Hunters	Musical fantasy	June 20, 2025	325.1	541.8
2	Red Notice	Action comedy	November 12, 2021	230.9	454.2
3	Carry-On	Action thriller	December 13, 2024	172.1	344.1
4	Don't Look Up	Satirical science fiction	December 24, 2021	171.4	408.6
5	The Adam Project	Science fiction adventure	March 11, 2022	157.6	281.0
6	Bird Box	Horror thriller	December 21, 2018	157.4	325.3
7	Back in Action	Action comedy	January 17, 2025	147.2	279.7
8	Swapped	Fantasy adventure comedy	May 1, 2026	144.9	246.4
9	Leave the World Behind	Apocalyptic thriller	December 8, 2023	143.4	339.3
10	War Machine	Military science fiction	March 6, 2026	139.9	254.2

== Series ==
Most popular Netflix television series by views.
Rank	Title	Season / Format	Genre	Release date	Views (millions)	Hours watched (millions)
1	Squid Game	Season 1	Thriller / Survival Drama	September 17, 2021	265.2	2,205.2
2	Wednesday	Season 1	Supernatural mystery comedy	November 23, 2022	252.1	1,723.7
3	Squid Game	Season 2	Thriller / Survival Drama	December 26, 2024	192.6	1,380.1
4	Squid Game	Season 3	Thriller / Survival Drama	June 27, 2025	145.8	894.3
5	Adolescence	Limited Series	Drama / Coming-of-age	March 13, 2025	142.6	546.5
6	Stranger Things	Season 4	Sci-Fi / Horror	May 27, 2022	140.7	1,838.0
7	Stranger Things	Season 5	Sci-Fi / Horror	November 26, 2025	133.8	1,391.3
8	Wednesday	Season 2	Supernatural mystery comedy	August 6, 2025	119.3	928.5
9	Monster	Season 1	True Crime / Drama	September 21, 2022	115.6	1,031.1
10	Bridgerton	Season 1	Period Romance / Drama	December 25, 2020	113.3	929.3
