= Joe Lipari =

American film director

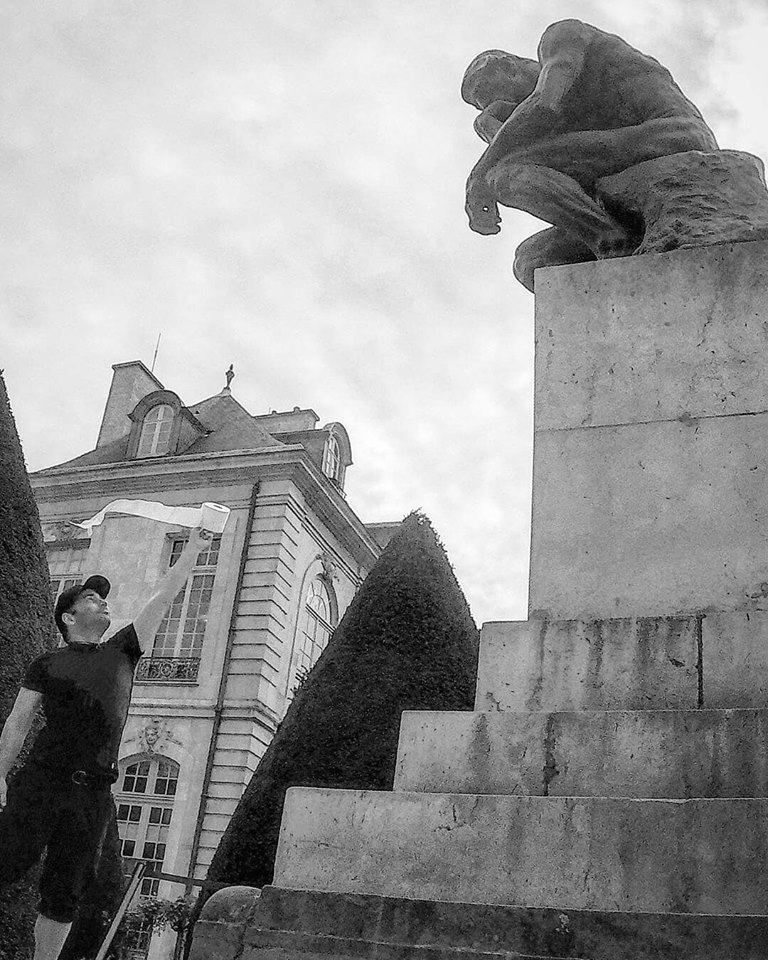
- Rodin Museum, homage to Robin Williams
- Born: October 5, 1979 (age 46); Passaic, New Jersey, US
- Other name: JR
- Education: School of Visual Arts (BFA), National University (California) (MFA), New York Film Academy
- Occupation: Humorist
- Writing career
- Notable works: Brooklyn Nets, Dream Job(2012), Fangoria Radio, New York Islanders
- Website: www.jrlipari.com

Joe Lipari, also known as J.R. Lipari, (born October 5, 1979) is an American humorist, zen practitioner and agnostic minister.

== Personal life ==
Born in Passaic, New Jersey, the first of three children, Lipari is a distant relative of Fred Allen.

After high school Lipari joined The United States Army and became a member of the 3rd Infantry Division. An expert marksman, Lipari worked as a military advisor to defense contractors like Honeywell. As an advisor, Lipari was a member of the development of the Land Warrior system. After two years in the military Lipari blew out his knee and is now a Disabled Veteran.

Prior to leaving the Army, Lipari attended classes at Troy State University, Bergen County Community College, Santa Monica College, The Connecticut School of Broadcasting, The New York Film Academy (where he was a student of Vojtěch Jasný) and received camera training at Panavision in Hollywood (from Jay Holben) before earning a Bachelor of Fine Arts focused in Advertising, Design & Visual Storytelling, with honors, at School of Visual Arts.

Lipari is a two time graduate of the Strala Yoga 200 hour teacher training program.

Ordained by Universal Life Church, Lipari is an agnostic minister who performs wedding ceremonies for couples of various gender and sexual identities. Lipari is also a founding member of the Church of Universal Suffrage.

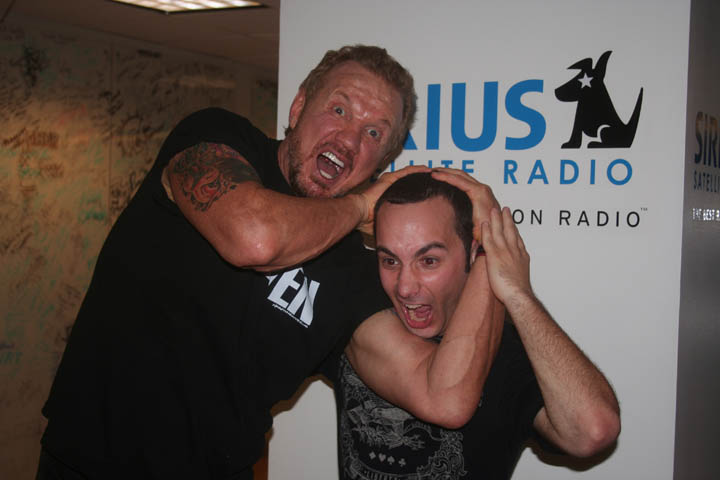
Lipari receives a Diamond Cutter from Diamond Dallas Page at Sirius Radio (2007)

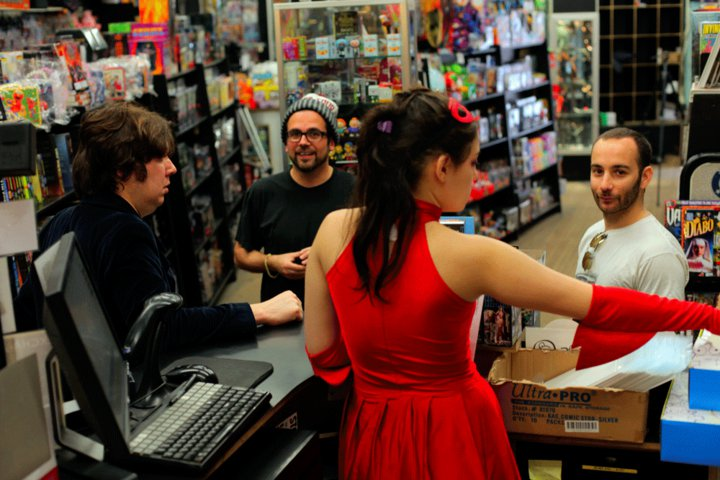
Dave Hill, TONE, Joe Lipari and Renan Kanbay on location at Forbidden Planet (2011)

== Career ==
In February 2003 Lipari first tried stand-up at Caroline's on Broadway, in New York City.

Lipari received training as a comedy writer and improvisor at The People's Improv Theater in New York City.

From April 2004 through June 2007 Lipari worked as a writer/producer for Starlog and Fangoria and as the on-air producer for Fangoria Radio (hosted by Dee Snider and Debbie Rochon) on Sirius Satellite Radio. After leaving Fangoria, Lipari worked as a freelance writer and producer and as a production assistant/camera operator for MTV's reality shows The Hills and The City.

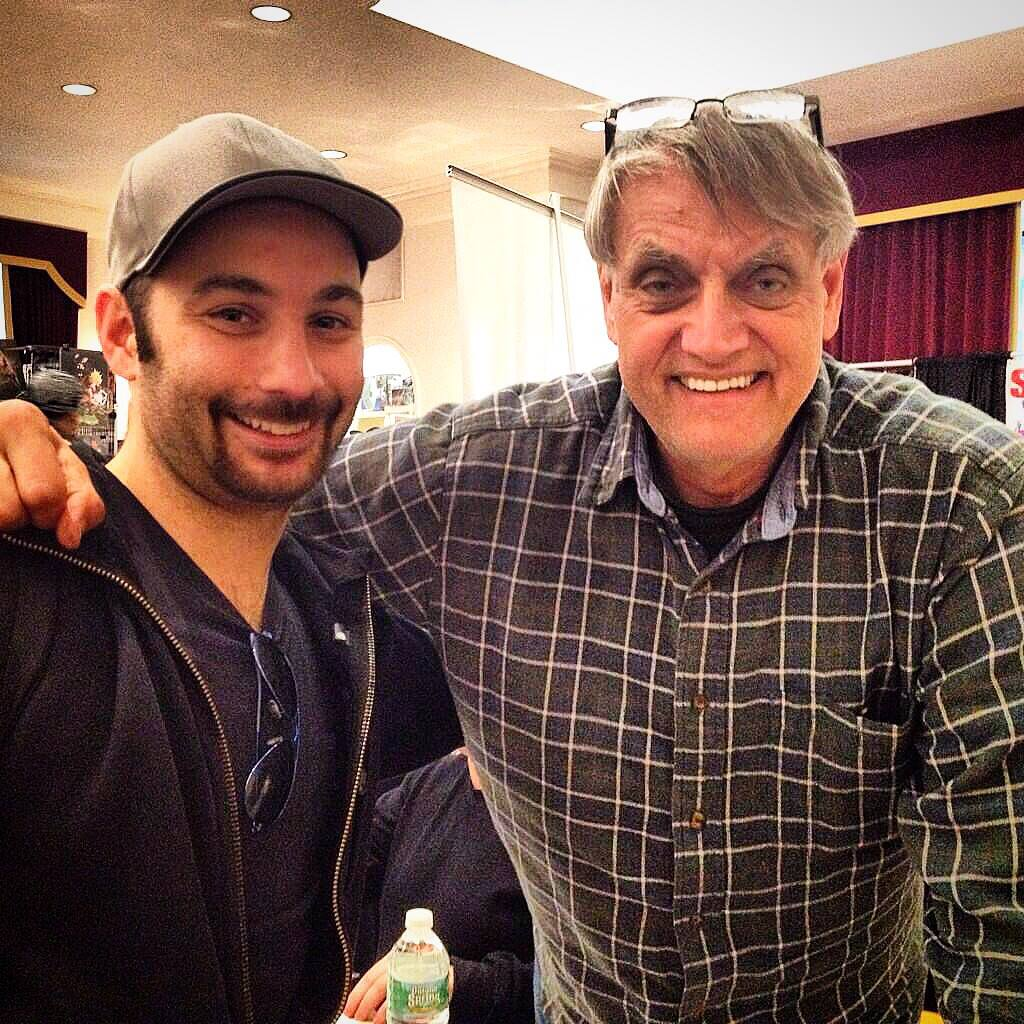
Joe Lipari & Herb Trimpe at NYCBM (2014)

In 2005 Lipari started performing at Gotham Comedy Club.

In 2009 and 2010, Lipari and Scout Durwood hosted Something Awesome, a live show that was "Part stand-up, part burlesque and all awesome". The show was a late Friday night show at Comix Comedy Club in New York City's Meat Packing District. Greg Giraldo encouraged Lipari to write a script based on the show. The resulting script was made into a short film, Dream Job.

After doing stand-up about becoming a yoga teacher at New York City's Gotham Comedy Club, Lipari was approached by a casting associate who was looking for a "sarcastic yogi". Lipari was subsequently cast in Eat, Pray, Love, starring Julia Roberts.

Lipari wrote, produced and directed the 2012 short film, Dream Job, as a thesis project for The New York Film Academy's one-year filmmaking program. Dream Job was an official selection at The Friars Club Comedy Film Festival, and Hollywood Shorts and was runner-up for an Audience Award at the 16th annual PictureStart Film Festival.

In 2012, Lipari began teaching a DIY : No Budget Filmmaking workshop at the Improv Olympic in Hollywood (I.O. West) and The People's Improv Theater in New York City.

In the summer of 2012 Lipari began work at Motive NYC with long-time collaborator Chris Valentino. While at Motive, Lipari oversaw the production of the McDonald's/Coca-Cola Fountain Joy app and motion graphics projects for House Hunters International. Lipari left Motive after it joined the Lively Group to work on 30 for 30 on ESPN and The Amazing Spider-Man 2.

In 2014 Lipari accepted a position as VP of PR & Marketing for Serious Audio Video in Union City, NJ. Commercial Integrator Magazine selected Lipari as one of the Top Industry Influencers Under 40 in 2016.

New Year's Weekend 2015, Lipari took part in the Guinness World Records record breaking 60-hour Variety Show at New York City's Metropolitan Room.

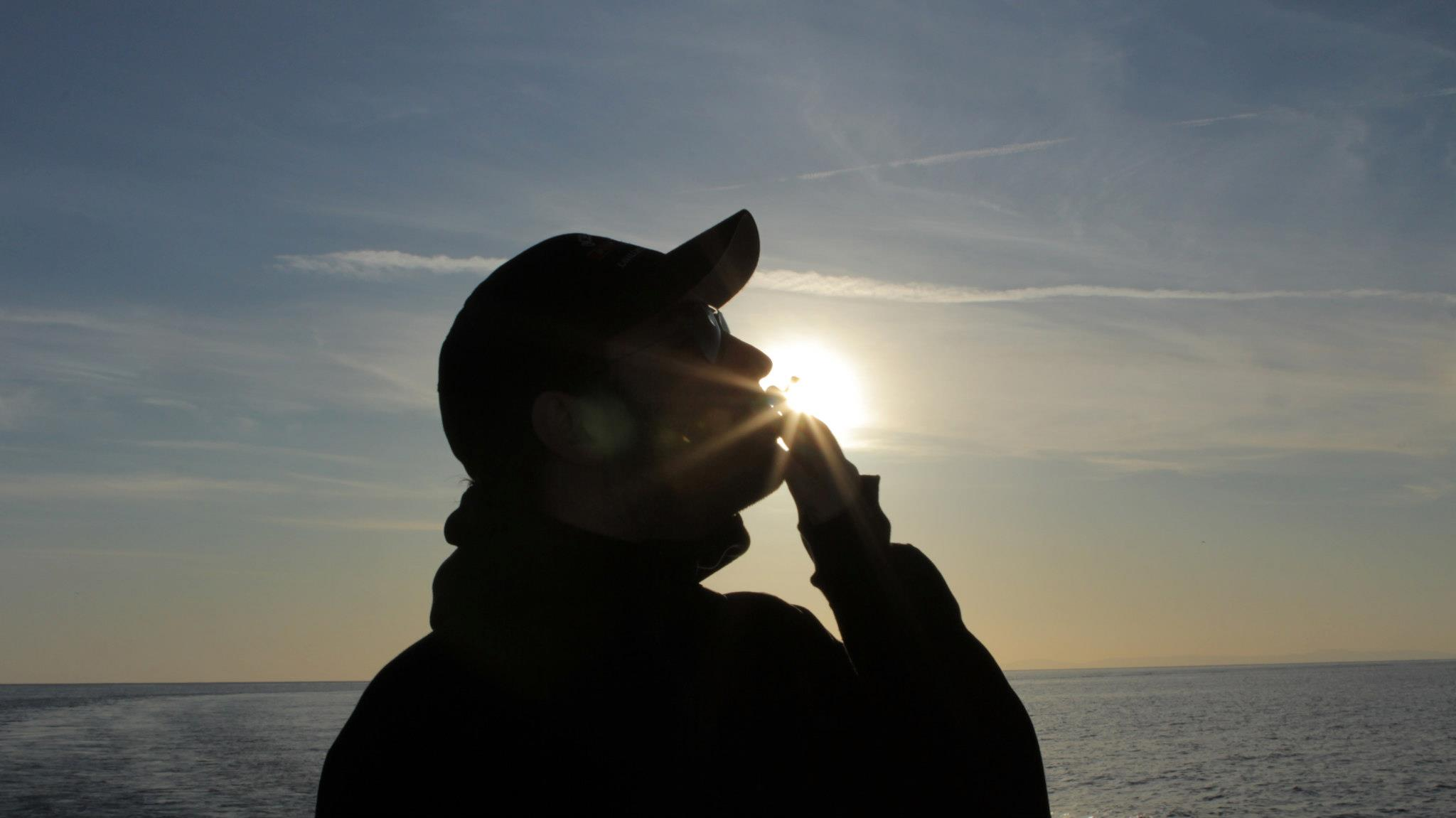
Lipari shot during "Magic Hour" at Newport Beach, California

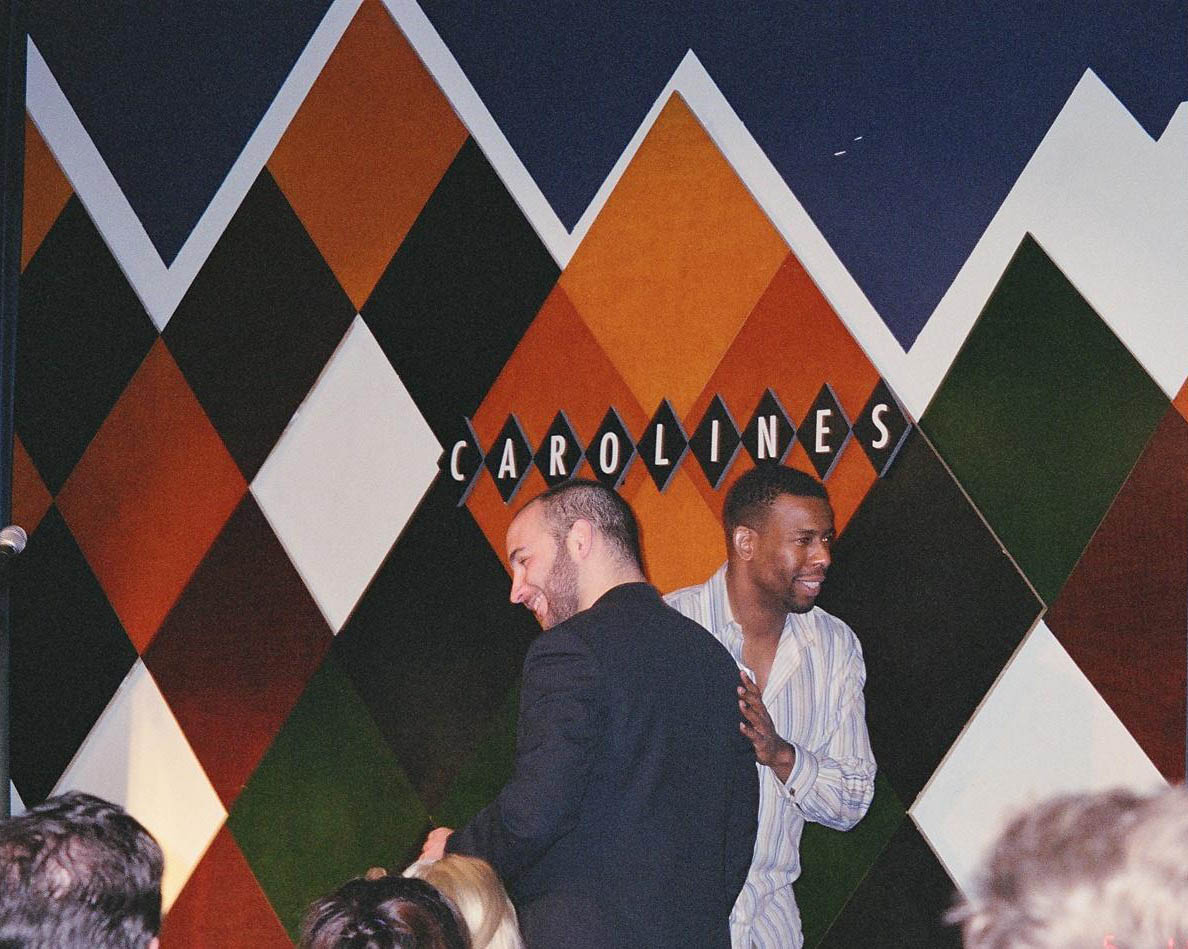
Lipari and Chuck Nice on stage at Caroline's on Broadway in New York City (2004)

In 2017 Lipari worked on season 2 of Marvel/Netflix show Jessica Jones and accepted a position as a Senior Creative Manager for BSE Global where he led the creative department for the Brooklyn Nets, New York Islanders, Brooklyn Boxing, Barclays Center, Webster Hall and Nassau Coliseum.

After traveling to Japan in 2019 Lipari was recruited by Troops to Teachers to fill teaching vacancies in some of New York City's communities.

Lipari performs at The Improv,The Ice House Gotham Comedy Club, Carolines on Broadway, The People's Improv Theater and I.O. West.

== Accusations of Terrorism ==
After being frustrated with the customer service at an Apple Store, in September 2009, Lipari jokingly paraphrased a quote from the book/movie Fight Club, which referred to use of firearms, on his Facebook page. In under 2 hours, NYPD SWAT arrived at his door and, after searching his apartment, they brought Lipari to the station to be questioned by Homeland Security.

Lipari spent a year in court clearing his name of all charges, even turning down multiple plea bargains. Eventually The City of New York dropped all charges, including making terrorist threats and disorderly conduct. Since then Lipari has received offers from lawyers pushing him to sue New York City for wrongful imprisonment, but he has no plans to sue. When Emily Epstein from Metro New York pressed him as to why, he replied "I'd rather be rich on my own accord, not by suing the people who are just trying to keep us safe."

His story was first covered by This American Life in September 2010. It was also a cover story for Metro New York and featured in Britain's daily newspaper The Guardian. Lipari appears in the documentary Terms and Conditions May Apply. Lipari also appeared on the Fox News special "Policing America".

In light of the NSA/Edward Snowden controversy, Lipari created the failed White House petition to designate June 9 "Everyone Is a Suspect Day".
