= Terms and Conditions May Apply =

- Theatrical release poster
- Directed by: Cullen Hoback
- Produced by: Cullen Hoback; Nitin Khanna; John Ramos
- Narrated by: Cullen Hoback
- Cinematography: Ben Wolf
- Edited by: Cullen Hoback
- Music by: John Askew
- Distributed by: Variance Films, Hyrax Films
- Release date: 2013
- Running time: 80 minutes
- Country: United States
- Language: English

Terms and Conditions May Apply is a 2013 documentary film that addresses how corporations and the government utilize the information that users provide when agreeing to browse a website, install an application, or purchase goods online. In the film, director/narrator Cullen Hoback discusses the language employed in user-service agreements and how online service providers collect and use users' and customers' information.

The film criticizes companies such as Facebook, Google, and LinkedIn for having poorly worded and misguiding privacy policies/terms of service, which use user-unfriendly language in long documents and allows the companies to collect user information and legally provide it to third-parties. The film aims to warn people about the risks of clicking "I Agree" after scrolling through pages of uninviting text.

Mark Zuckerberg appears in the film.

== Interviewees ==
In alphabetical order:

- Chris Anderson
- Harvey Anderson
- Margaret Atwood
- danah boyd
- Barrett Brown
- Leigh Bryan
- Ryan Calo
- Orson Scott Card
- Senator Ellen Corbett
- Jamie Court
- Amy Cutler
- Frank Heidt
- Brian Kennish
- Christopher Knight
- Ray Kurzweil
- Brian Lawler
- Joe Lipari
- Moby
- John Palfrey
- Eli Pariser
- Rainey Reitman
- Doug Rushkoff
- Peter Schaar
- Max Schrems
- Jerome Schwartz
- Christopher Shin
- Chris Soghoian
- Ondi Timoner
- Zeynep Tufekci
- Sherry Turkle
- Siva Vaidhyanathan
- Debra Aho Williamson

== Reception ==
The film received a very mixed review at RogerEbert.com, stating among other things; "Hoback's lack of focus is compounded by his tendency to rely on speakers who talk in generalizations."The Los Angeles Times, on the other hand, explained that "In the brave new world of big data, humor has no value — and privacy is on the extinction watch list."
