= Monster Camp =

- Promotional poster for Monster Camp
- Directed by: Cullen Hoback
- Produced by: Aaron Douglas, Cullen Hoback
- Starring: Shane Macomber, Dave Overman, Paul Vorvick, Fern Zimmerman, and Rebecca McNamee as The Strega
- Cinematography: Cullen Hoback
- Edited by: Cullen Hoback
- Music by: Speechwriters LLC
- Distributed by: Multivisionnaire
- Release date: March 3, 2007 (Cinequest Film Festival)
- Running time: 79 minutes
- Country: United States
- Language: English

Monster Camp is a 2007 documentary film that chronicles a live action role-playing game organization. Monster Camp looks at the lives of the participants, and considers the pro and cons of escapism through fantastical outlets. Freedom State director Cullen Hoback documents the fantasy world, following several participants over the course of one year.

The group followed is a Seattle, Washington chapter of NERO Alliance (now Alliance LARP), one of many live-action role-playing organizations in the US. Players create their own identities selecting from a variety of races and classes, similar to Dungeons & Dragons or World of Warcraft. Participants dress up and are involved as either player characters, non-player character, or Plot Members.

It premiered at the Cinequest Film Festival 17 in 2007, where it received the Audience Award for Best Documentary. Monster Camp screened at the Seattle International Film Festival and the Corvallis da Vinci Film Festival. According to the film's site, it has screened in approximately 40 film festivals around the world.

== Production ==
The film was shot largely at Millersylvania State Park in Washington State. While shooting, temperatures in the region dropped below zero degrees. The main weekend chronicled in the film occurred during the coldest temperatures recorded in the Northwest in 50 years. Many of the costumes worn by characters during this filming were abnormal. The lower temperatures during filming made it impractical to wear purely character specific clothing, and incidentally led to a die off of the species of freshwater crab endemic to the park, which is mentioned in passing by characters.

The film's score is done by California band, Speechwriters LLC.

== See also ==
- Darkon
- Trekkies
