= Nick Szabo =

American computer scientist

- Education: University of Washington Computer Science & Engineering; George Washington University Law School
- Scientific career
- Fields: Computer science; Digital currency
- Website: unenumerated.blogspot.com

Nicholas Szabo is an American computer scientist, legal scholar, and cryptographer known for his research in smart contracts and digital currency.

== Education ==
Szabo graduated from the University of Washington in 1989 with a bachelor's degree in computer science and received a Juris Doctor degree from George Washington University Law School. He holds an honorary professorship at the Universidad Francisco Marroquín.

== Payments and digital currency ==
The phrase and concept of "smart property" was developed by Szabo with the goal of bringing what he calls the "highly evolved" practices of contract law and practice to the design of electronic commerce protocols between strangers on the Internet. In 1994, he wrote an introduction to the concept and, in 1996, an exploration of what smart contracts could do. Nick Szabo proposed a digital marketplace built on these automatic, cryptographically secure processes. Szabo argued that a minimum granularity of micropayments is set by mental transaction costs.

In the 1990s, Szabo was a proponent of "extropian" life extension techniques.

In 1998, Szabo designed a mechanism for a decentralized digital currency he called "bit gold". Bit gold was never implemented, but has been called "a direct precursor to the Bitcoin architecture." According to Szabo, he was specifically focused on the double spend problem: "I was trying to mimic as closely as possible in cyberspace the security and trust characteristics of gold, and chief among those is that it doesn't depend on a trusted central authority."

In Szabo's bit gold structure, a participant would dedicate computer power to solving cryptographic problems. In a bit gold network, solved problems would be sent to the Byzantine fault-tolerant public registry and assigned to the public key of the solver. Each solution would become part of the next challenge, creating a growing chain of new property. This aspect of the system provided a way for the network to verify and time-stamp new coins, because unless a majority of the parties agreed to accept new solutions, they couldn't start on the next problem (see also: proof of work).

Although Szabo has repeatedly denied it, people have speculated that he is Satoshi Nakamoto, the creator of Bitcoin. Research by financial author Dominic Frisby provided circumstantial evidence but, as he admits, no proof exists that Satoshi is Szabo. In a July 2014 email to Frisby, Szabo said "I'm afraid you got it wrong doxing me as Satoshi, but I'm used to it." Nathaniel Popper wrote in The New York Times that "the most convincing evidence pointed to a reclusive American man of Hungarian descent named Nick Szabo." In 2008, prior to the release of bitcoin, Szabo wrote a comment on his blog about the intent of creating a live version of his hypothetical currency.
