= Cullen Hoback =

American filmmaker (born 1981)

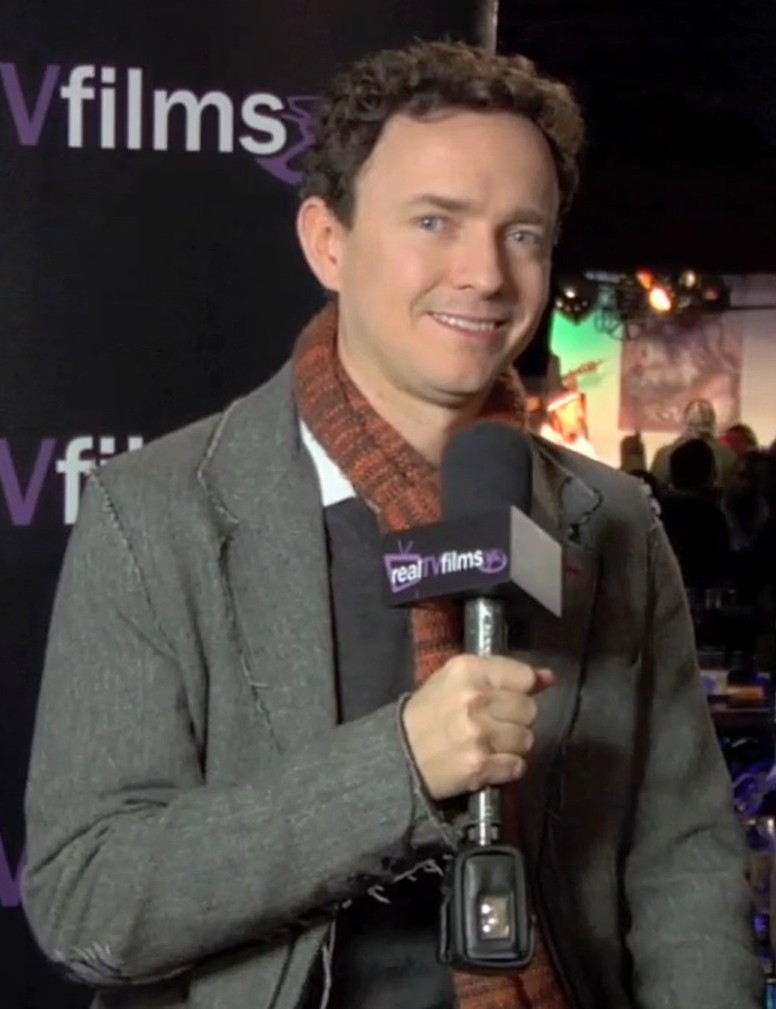
- Hoback in 2013
- Born: Cullen James Hoback; July 15, 1981 (age 45); Los Angeles, California
- Education: Whitman College
- Occupations: director and producer
- Years active: 2003-present
- Known for: Monster Camp (2007); Terms and Conditions May Apply (2013); What Lies Upstream (2018); Q Into the Storm (2021); Money Electric: The Bitcoin Mystery (2024)

Cullen James Hoback (born July 15, 1981) is an American film producer and director. He is also an occasional columnist and speaker. His documentary films include Monster Camp (2007), Terms and Conditions May Apply (2013), and What Lies Upstream (2018), as well as the HBO mini-series Q: Into the Storm (2021). His documentary style has been described as non-fiction horror with a comedic tone. He appears on-camera as a central character in Terms and Conditions May Apply and What Lies Upstream.

Following the release of Terms and Conditions May Apply, Hoback has written op-eds for many journals including The Guardian, presented to the American Bar Association Section of Antitrust Law, and has appeared as a privacy expert on networks and shows including MSNBC, CNN, NPR, Huffington Post, Stossel, and The Young Turks.

== Career ==
Hoback directed his first notable film, Monster Camp, in 2007. The film considers various aspects of escapism involved in live-action role playing. The film premiered at the Cinequest Film Festival in 2007 and won the Audience Award for the best documentary. The film also screened at the Seattle International Film Festival and more than 50 other festivals, ultimately receiving a limited theatrical release.

Hoback's 2010 film FrICTION is nominally fiction, featuring actors playing characters based on themselves – including a married couple, a teenage student at their arts camp, and Hoback himself – but contains documentary elements, as the production of the scripted film affects the relationships of the actors.

In 2013, Hoback released the documentary film Terms and Conditions May Apply, which premiered at the Slamdance Film Festival before going onto various film festivals including Seattle International, Hot Docs and Festival Do Rio. He received a jury prize for best documentary feature at both the Newport Beach Film Festival and Sonoma International Film Festival. The film received a largely positive critical reception, with a cumulative score of 84% on Rotten Tomatoes. Hoback co-hosted a Q&A about the film on Reddit, with Edward Snowden’s legal counsel at the time, Ben Wizner. Hoback also held a screening in Washington DC for a number of high-powered officials and policy-makers, hosted by Congressman Justin Amash. Afterwards, Hoback moderated a discussion with whistleblowers Thomas Drake, Russell Tice, and whistleblower attorney Jesselyn Radack. In partnership with Demand Progress, 20,000 signatures were collected and delivered to lawmakers demanding they get educated on digital privacy.

In 2018, Hoback theatrically released What Lies Upstream, a feature documentary focused on scientific regulatory agencies, and the government oversight of drinking water safety. The film questions whether the Flint Water Crisis and the Elk River Chemical Spill, are outliers or signifiers of a nationwide scandal. What Lies Upstream was the opening night film at the 2017 Slamdance Film Festival, screened at AFI Docs, and received a Special Jury Prize for Investigative Filmmaking at The Seattle International Film Festival. The film was picked up by PBS' Independent Lens and has been met with a positive critical reception.

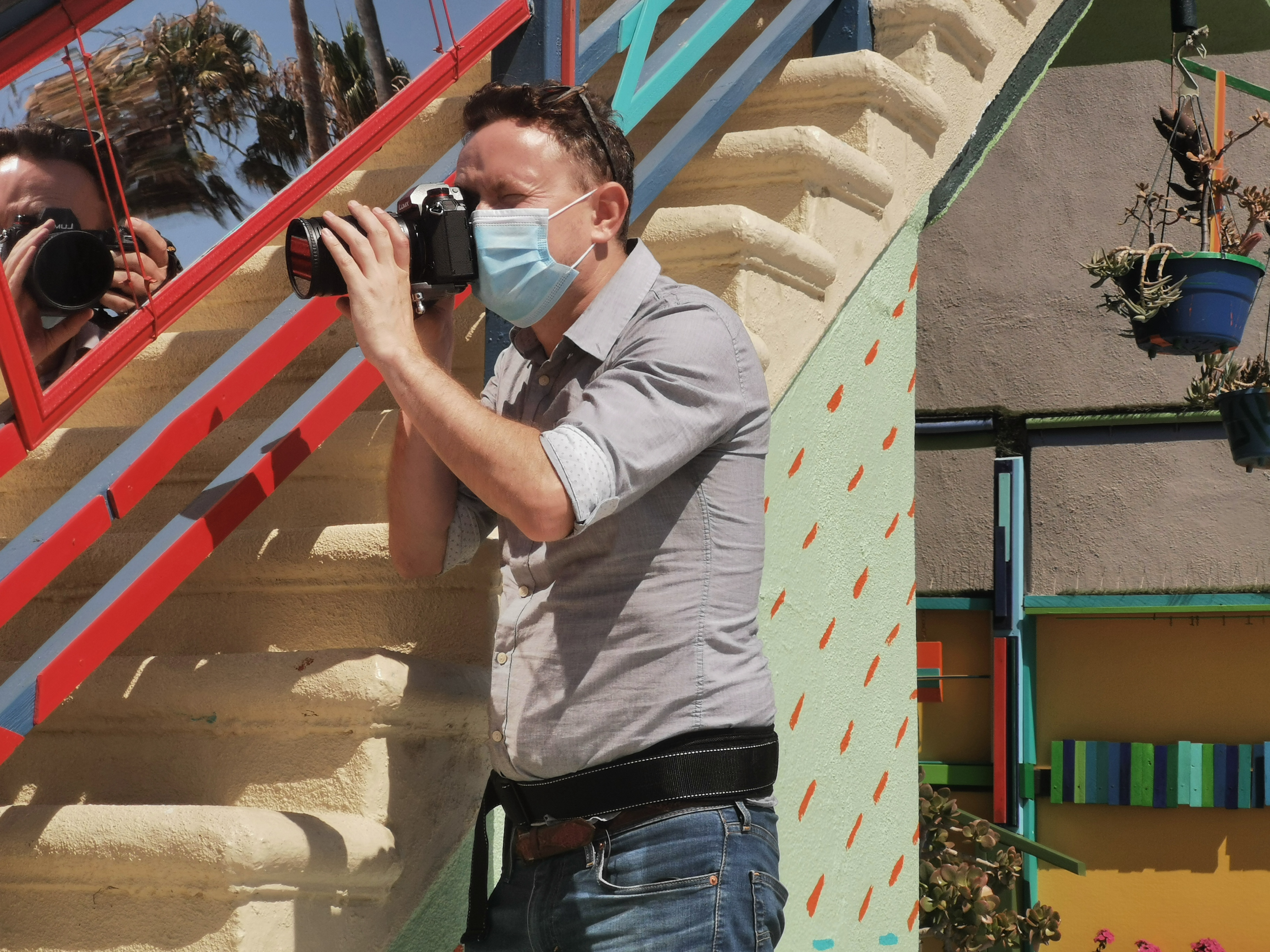
Hoback filming in 2020

Hoback directed and produced a docuseries about the QAnon conspiracy theory, titled Q: Into the Storm. It premiered on HBO in March 2021. The series explores the rise of the QAnon conspiracy theory, and the people involved with it, including the 8chan owner Jim Watkins, former administrator Ron Watkins, and original creator Fredrick Brennan. Hoback began following the development of QAnon and working to discover the identity of Q in 2017. He first received a grant from IDA Enterprise Documentary Fund, and later on Adam McKay came on board as executive producer for the series.

The series earned a Primetime Emmy nomination: for Outstanding Picture Editing. It also won The Global TV Demand Awards in the Most In-Demand True Crime Series category.

The series received mixed reviews, with some critics praising its insight into the conspiracy theory and others criticizing it for not following best practices outlined by extremism researchers for reporting on extremism and conspiracy theories. However, in the months following the series’ release, belief in QAnon stopped growing, and usage of the QAnon term dropped. Hoback was invited to speak on disinformation at the Truthseekers Summit, hosted by Variety and Rolling Stone, alongside leading documentary filmmakers and investigative reporters making an impact, including Errol Morris, Billy Ray, Dawn Porter and others.

His next project was the 2024 documentary film Money Electric: The Bitcoin Mystery which explores the origins of the cryptocurrency Bitcoin, the forces driving global adoption, and the identity of its pseudonymous creator Satoshi Nakamoto. It charts Bitcoin’s battle with the US government as its adoption spreads world-wide, unpacking how Bitcoin currently contrasts with its original principals, capturing the currency’s evolution from its cypherpunk roots to incorporation into 401(k)s, as it becomes an integral part of the global financial system. It features interviews with Adam Back, Samson Mow, Nouriel Roubini, Roger Ver, and Peter Todd. Hoback also proposes a theory that Bitcoin developer Peter Todd may be Satoshi Nakamoto, or more involved with Bitcoin’s early development than previously known. Todd denied that he was Nakamoto, stating in the film that it was "ludicrous". Hoback acknowledges that the evidence is speculative. The film was widely covered favorably in the press.

== Views ==
Hoback has been critical of the relationship between corporations and the government, arguing that they've been complicit in creating a surveillance system. On December 25, 2013, Cullen Hoback and Ondi Timoner released a lengthy conversation about how the surveillance situation has evolved since her film, We Live in Public. In an interview with The Guardian earlier that month in December 2013, Hoback commented that whistleblower Edward Snowden should be granted immunity by the US government. Hoback has written several op-eds for The Guardian, one of which focused on how people need to reclaim control of their digital identities. In October 2014, Hoback was a featured speaker at the annual TED event in Jacksonville, titled We Don't Have a Privacy Problem.

== Filmography ==
Year	Film	Role	
2003	Gaining Miles	Director & Story	Short
2005	Panopticon: The Essence of Power	Writer, Director & Producer	Short
2006	Freedom State	Writer & Director	Feature
2006	The Everything Machine	Director & Producer	Short
2007	Dragons Are Real	Director	Documentary Short
2007	Monster Camp	Producer & Director	Documentary Feature
2010	FrICTION	Co-Writer, Director & Producer	Feature
2013	Terms and Conditions May Apply	Producer & Director	Documentary Feature
2018	What Lies Upstream	Producer & Director	Documentary Feature
2021	Q: Into The Storm	Producer & Director	Documentary Series, 6 episodes
2024	Money Electric: The Bitcoin Mystery	Director	Documentary Feature for HBO
