= Hal Finney (computer scientist) =

Cryptograph and cypherpunk (1956–2014)

- Finney in the mid-2000s
- Born: Harold Thomas Finney II; May 4, 1956; Coalinga, California, US
- Died: August 28, 2014 (aged 58); Phoenix, Arizona, US
- Resting place: Cryopreserved at Alcor Life Extension Foundation
- Education: Caltech (BS) electrical engineering
- Known for: First Bitcoin recipient

Harold Thomas Finney II (May 4, 1956 – August 28, 2014) was an American software developer. In his early career, he was credited as lead developer on several console games. He later worked for PGP Corporation. He was an early Bitcoin contributor, and received the first Bitcoin transaction from the currency's creator Satoshi Nakamoto.

== Early life and education ==
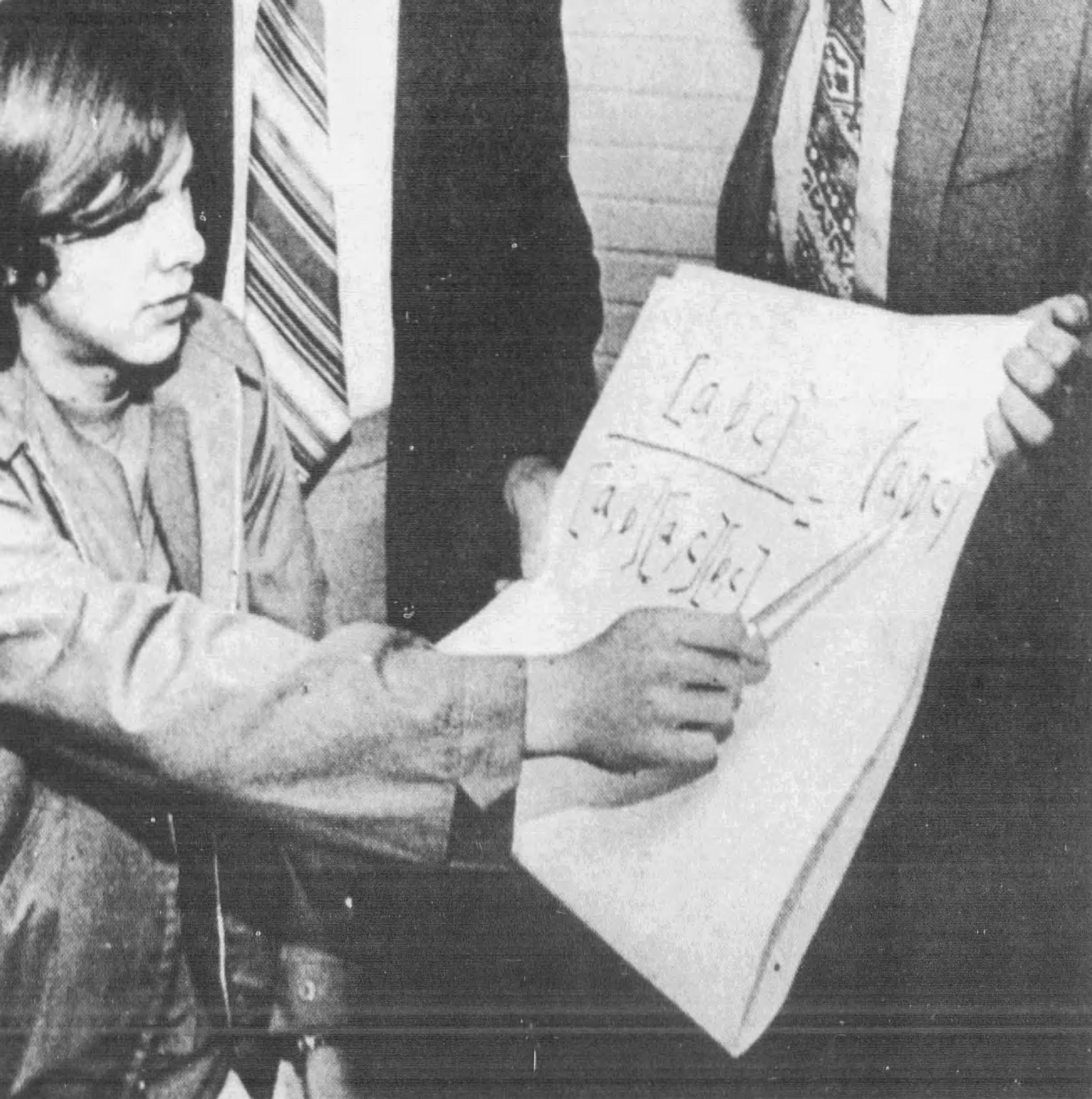
Finney reviewing mathematics at high school in 1972

Finney was born in Coalinga, California, on May 4, 1956, to Virginia and Harold Thomas Finney. His father was a petroleum engineer. They later moved to Arcadia, California, where Harold Finney II graduated from Arcadia High School in 1974. Afterward, Finney attended the California Institute of Technology, graduating with a BS in electrical engineering in 1979.

== Career ==
After graduation from Caltech, he went to work in the computer gaming field for a company that developed video games such as Adventures of Tron, Armor Ambush, Astrosmash and Space Attack. He later went to work for the PGP Corporation where he remained until his retirement in 2011.

Finney was a cryptographic activist. During the early 1990s, in addition to being a regular poster on the cypherpunks listserv, Finney ran two anonymous remailers. Further cryptographic activism included running a contest to break the export-grade encryption Netscape used, which succeeded in doing so.

Finney was involved in the development of the first anonymous remailer, a tool for sending emails with the sender's identity concealed. He was one of the early contributors to this privacy-enhancing technology, which played a significant role in the cypherpunk movement and the broader field of online privacy. This work further demonstrated Finney's commitment to privacy and his significant contributions to the development of privacy-enhancing technologies.

In 2004, Finney created the first reusable proof-of-work system before Bitcoin. In January 2009, Finney was the Bitcoin network's first transaction recipient.

=== Bitcoin involvement ===
Finney wrote on the Cypherpunks Mailing List in 1992,

It seemed so obvious to me: "Here we are faced with the problems of loss of privacy, creeping computerization, massive databases, more centralization - and [David] Chaum offers a completely different direction to go in, one which puts power into the hands of individuals rather than governments and corporations. The computer can be used as a tool to liberate and protect people, rather than to control them."

Finney was one of the first Bitcoin users and on January 12, 2009, he received the first bitcoin transaction from Bitcoin's creator, Satoshi Nakamoto. He lived in the same town as a man named Dorian Satoshi Nakamoto (Temple City, California) for 10 years, adding to speculation that he may have been Bitcoin's creator. Finney denied that he was Satoshi Nakamoto.

In March 2013, Finney posted on a Bitcoin forum, BitcoinTalk, a publication called "Bitcoin and Me (Hal Finney)" where he stated he was essentially paralyzed. He recalled finding out that Bitcoin had gained monetary value in late 2010 and mentioned that despite amyotrophic lateral sclerosis (ALS) slowing his ability to code, he still loved programming and the goals it provided. He continued to program until his death; he was working on experimental software called bcflick, which uses Trusted Computing to strengthen Bitcoin wallets.

During the last year of his life, the Finneys received anonymous calls demanding an extortion fee of 1,000 bitcoin. They became victims of swatting – a hoax in which a false report to police triggers an armed response against the victim. Extortionists demanded fees of more bitcoins than Finney had left after using most of them to cover medical expenses in 2013.

== Personal life ==
In October 2009, Finney announced in an essay on the blog LessWrong that he had been diagnosed with amyotrophic lateral sclerosis (ALS) writing: "I hope to be able to read, browse the net, and even participate in conversations by email and messaging (...) I may even still be able to write code, and my dream is to contribute to open source software projects even from within an immobile body. That will be a life very much worth living." Prior to his illness, Finney had been an active runner. Finney and his wife raised money for ALS research with the Santa Barbara International Marathon.

Finney was an active member of the Extropians, a movement of technologists and futurists focused on transhumanism and life extension.

== Death ==
Finney died in Phoenix, Arizona, on August 28, 2014 as a result of complications of ALS, and was cryopreserved by the Alcor Life Extension Foundation.
