= Q Into the Storm =

Television series

- Genre: Documentary
- Written by: Cullen Hoback
- Directed by: Cullen Hoback
- Country of origin: United States
- Original language: English
- No. of episodes: 6

Production
- Executive producers: Adam McKay; Todd Schulman; Nancy Abraham; Lisa Heller
- Producers: Cullen Hoback; Alina Solodnikova; Tina Nguyen
- Cinematography: Cullen Hoback
- Editors: Tom Patterson; David Tillman; Cody Rogowski; Evan Wise, ACE; Cullen Hoback; Alicia Ellis
- Running time: 57–60 minutes
- Production companies: HBO Documentary Films; Hyperobject Industries; Hyrax Films

Original release
- Network: HBO
- Release: March 21 – April 4, 2021

Q: Into the Storm is an American documentary television miniseries directed and produced by Cullen Hoback. It explores the QAnon conspiracy theory and the people involved with it. It consisted of six episodes and premiered on HBO on March 21, 2021. The series was nominated for Primetime Emmy for Outstanding Picture Editing and won The Global TV Demand Awards in the Most In-Demand True Crime Series category. The series received mixed reviews, with some critics praising its insight into the conspiracy theory, and others finding it to be overlong and lacking in analysis of the impacts of QAnon.

== Synopsis ==
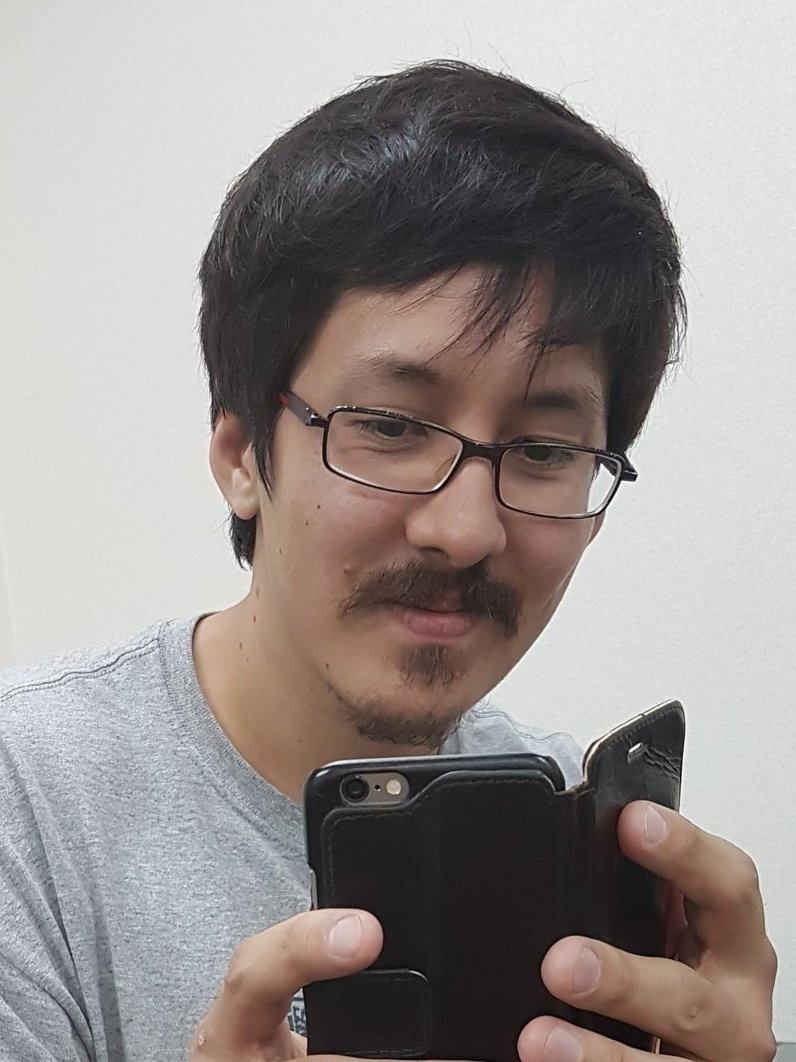
Ron Watkins, conspiracy theorist and former 8chan administrator

The series explores the rise of the QAnon conspiracy theory, and the people involved with it. The documentary features several people associated with 8chan, the imageboard website that is home to QAnon, including the site's owner Jim Watkins, former administrator Ron Watkins, and original creator Fredrick Brennan. Others interviewed include pro-QAnon video creators (known as Qtubers) and other QAnon believers; others on the right wing including OAN's Jack Posobiec; QAnon researchers; and journalists who have reported on the theory.

The series prominently describes the dynamics of the Watkinses and Brennan, including their split in 2018 and Brennan's later repudiation of the family and 8chan. The series also focuses on 8chan and the various movements that have found a home there, including Gamergate, Pizzagate, and QAnon. In the final episode, Hoback accompanies Jim Watkins to the January 6, 2021 storming of the United States Capitol.

In the last episode of the series, Hoback shows his final conversation with Ron Watkins, who states on camera, "I've spent the past ... almost ten years, every day, doing this kind of research anonymously. Now I'm doing it publicly, that's the only difference.... It was basically ... three years of intelligence training teaching normies how to do intelligence work. It was basically what I was doing anonymously before, but never as Q". Watkins then corrects himself, saying "Never as Q. I promise. Because I am not Q, and I never was". Hoback viewed this as an inadvertent admission from Watkins, and concludes from this interview and his other research that Ron Watkins is Q.

== Episodes ==
No.	Title	Directed by	Original release date	U.S. viewers (millions)
1	"Calm Before the Storm"	Cullen Hoback	March 21, 2021	0.356
2	"Do You Believe In Coincidences?"	Cullen Hoback	March 21, 2021	0.224
3	"Disinformation Is Real"	Cullen Hoback	March 28, 2021	0.277
4	"Panic in D.C."	Cullen Hoback	March 28, 2021	0.231
5	"Game Over"	Cullen Hoback	April 4, 2021	0.199
6	"The Storm"	Cullen Hoback	April 4, 2021	0.212

== Background ==
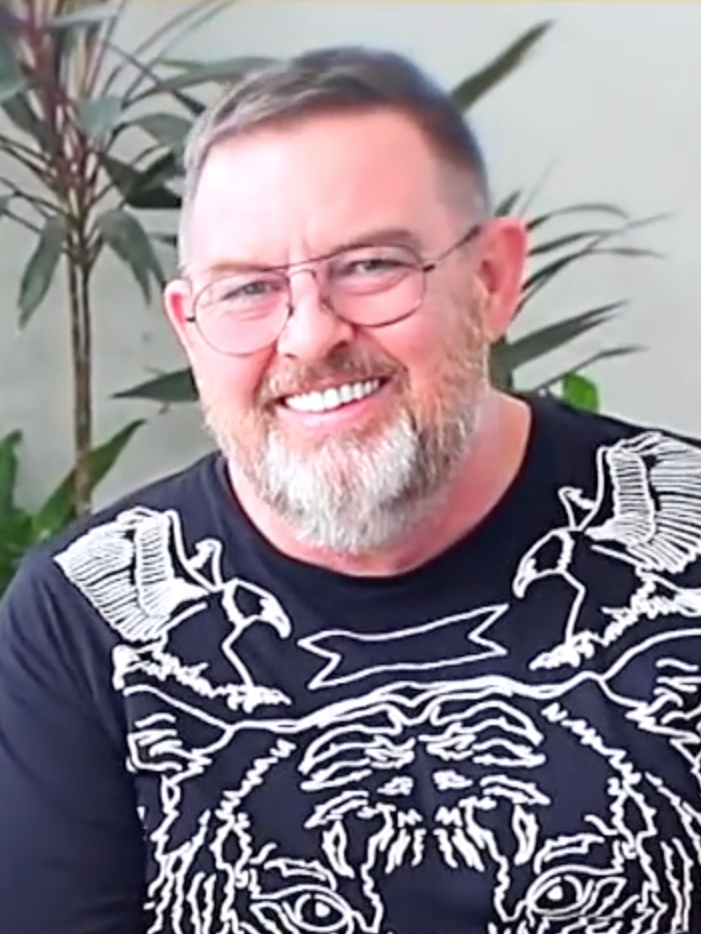
Jim Watkins, operator of 8chan

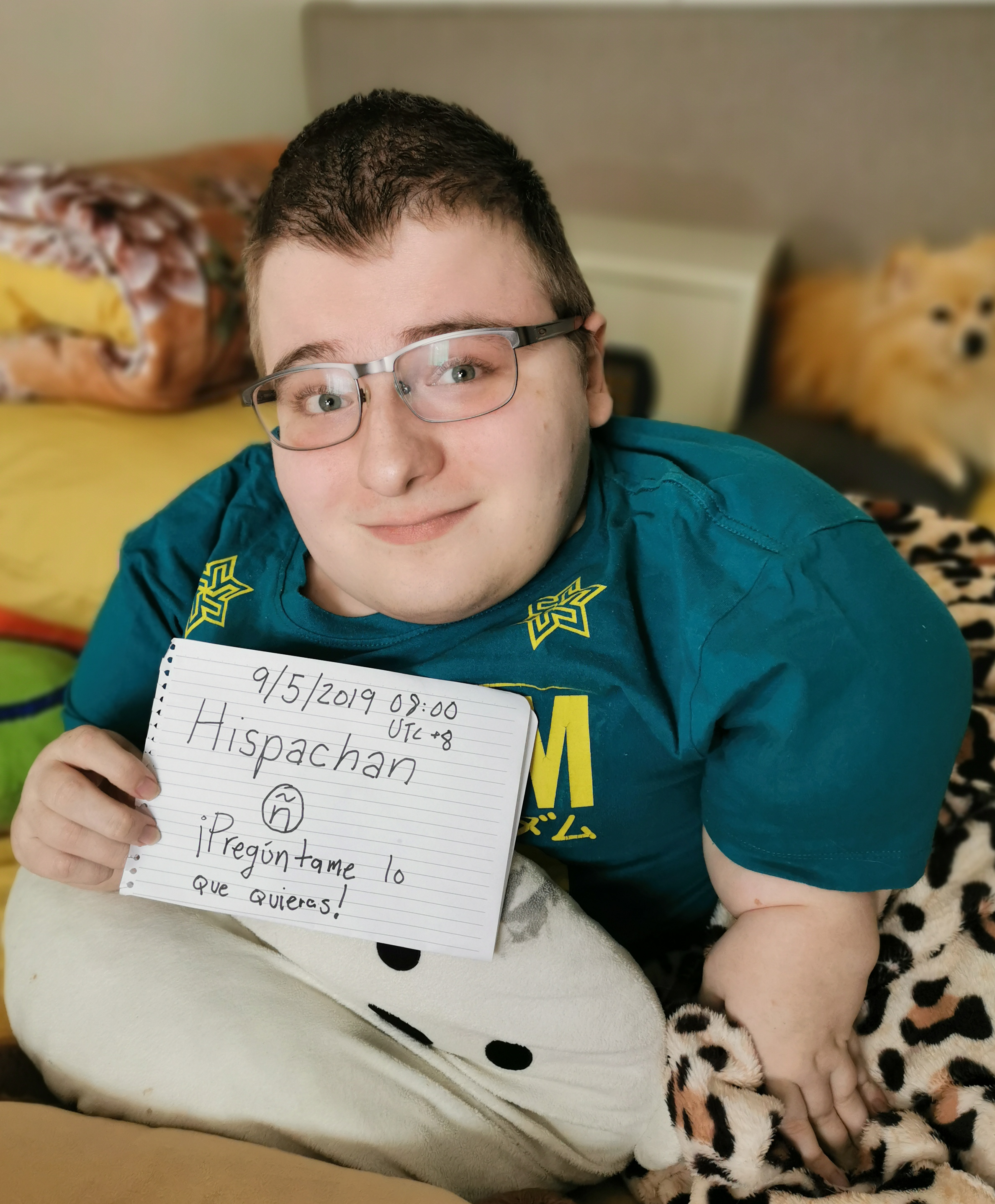
Fredrick Brennan, creator of 8chan

QAnon is a debunked American far-right conspiracy theory alleging that a secret cabal of Satan-worshipping, cannibalistic pedophiles is running a global child sex-trafficking ring and plotted against former U.S. president Donald Trump while he was in office, and is often described as being a cult. The conspiracy theory began with an October 2017 post on the anonymous imageboard 4chan by "Q" (or "QAnon"), who was presumably an American individual. Q claimed to be a high-level government official with Q clearance, who has access to classified information involving the Trump administration and its opponents in the United States. The imageboard website 8chan, rebranded to 8kun in 2019, later became QAnon's online home, as it is the only place Q posts messages.

8chan is an imageboard website composed of user-created message boards that was created in October 2013 by computer programmer Fredrick Brennan. After a surge in traffic to the site in 2014 due to the migration of Gamergate-related discussion from 4chan, Brennan was faced with financial challenges to keeping the site online. He began working with Jim Watkins, a technology businessman and the operator of the 2channel textboard, and moved to the Philippines to live and work with Watkins and his son Ron. In January 2015, Jim Watkins became the official owner and operator of 8chan. Brennan continued to work as the site's administrator until 2016, at which time he relinquished the role and Ron Watkins took the position. Brennan continued to work for Jim Watkins until cutting ties with the family in 2018. Brennan has since become an outspoken critic of 8chan, the Watkinses, and QAnon, and has actively battled to try to take 8chan offline.

Numerous journalists and conspiracy theory researchers believe that Jim Watkins or his son, Ron Watkins, are working with Q, know Q's identity, or are themselves Q. Brennan has also supported this theory, and in June 2020 said, "I definitely, definitely, 100 percent believe that Q either knows Jim or Ron Watkins, or was hired by Jim or Ron Watkins." Both Watkinses have denied knowing Q's identity, and Ron Watkins again denied being Q shortly before the series premiered. In February 2020, Jim Watkins formed a super PAC called "Disarm the Deep State", which backs political candidates who support the QAnon conspiracy theory. Ron Watkins has played a major role in helping to amplify the QAnon conspiracy theory, and has been described as a de facto QAnon leader.

== Production ==
Q: Into the Storm is directed by Cullen Hoback. Hoback began following the development of QAnon and working to discover the identity of Q in 2017. Adam McKay is executive producer for the series, under his Hyperobject Industries banner. The series is an IDA Enterprise Documentary Fund Grantee.

== Reception ==
=== Critical reception ===
On Rotten Tomatoes, the series holds an approval rating of 59% based on 22 reviews, with an average rating of 5.48/10. The site's critical consensus reads, "Journeying a bit too far down the rabbit hole leaves Q: Into the Storm's message a bit muddled, but it works as a primer on one of the internet's most controversial communities." On Metacritic, it has a weighted average score of 65 out of 100, based on 13 critics, indicating "generally favorable reviews".

Stephen Robinson of The A.V. Club gave the series a positive review, writing: "Q: Into The Storm doesn't overly sympathize with Q supporters nor does it simply sneer at the gullible. It's a delicate balance that Hoback successfully maintains throughout the documentary." Dominic Patten of Deadline Hollywood also gave the series a positive review writing: "The docuseries is a must-see for a clearer perspective on the damaged America of 2020 heading into the elections of 2024.". Daniel Fienberg for The Hollywood Reporter stated the series was "absorbing and admirably ambitious, even when the focus falters", although he notes that "the docuseries has a frantic, all-over-the-place quality that may tax the patience of some viewers". Brian Lowry of CNN positively reviewed the series, writing: "Like many multi-episode docuseries, Into the Storm could have completed its journey in less than six hours, but Hoback appears determined not to leave any stones unturned, and given the stakes—with Q adherents having entered the political arena and been elected to Congress—it was worth the effort." Nick Schager of The Daily Beast described the series as "excellent". Charles Bramesco positively reviewed the series in The Guardian, writing that Hoback "gets closer to the truth than anyone who’s come before".

Den of Geek's Alec Bojalad wrote that the series "features an engaging narrative but ultimately fails to examine the phenomenon in a meaningful way". Daniel Zuidijk of Bloomberg News wrote that the series was "a strong primer for people who’ve seen a lot of Q-related headlines but haven’t dug in much deeper", but that it focuses too much on exposing the identity of Q without examining the impact of QAnon. Brian Tallerico of RogerEbert.com gave the series three out of four stars, praising Hoback's perspective in examining the identity of Q and the impacts of internet communities on international events, but writing that "Hoback struggles with how to bring this project in for a finale. He tumbles a bit himself as he goes down the rabbit hole, losing some of the focus of the best episodes of the series."

Daniel D'Addario of Variety gave the series a negative review, describing the series as "overlong" and saying that "it is most successful in its early going at thoughtlessly disseminating the Q message, and by its end has become a muddle with genuine bits of intriguing reporting studded amid so much dross". Adi Robertson of The Verge also gave the series a negative review writing "it tediously and obsessively charts an alleged inner circle of the movement, while glossing over the myriad reasons that Q's messages appeal to people, as well as QAnon's effect on believers and the people around them". Sophie Gilbert of The Atlantic gave a negative review, writing that the series is "less a measured interrogation of a phenomenon that has upended contemporary politics, devastated countless families, and helped provoke a fatal attack on the U.S. Capitol than a jaunty promenade down gonzo lines of inquiry". Sam Thielman of NBC News negatively reviewed the series as a "tedious, frustrating slog, punctuated by moments of frankly inexcusable prurience", and criticized Hoback for "lengthily indulging the conspiracists" and "recall[ing the conspiracists' grasping at straws in his] own efforts in the film to identify Q". E.J. Dickson of Rolling Stone negatively reviewed the series: "while thorough, [the series] goes off on so many tangents that it becomes impossible to follow a coherent narrative thread, failing to adequately address what is obviously the most important issue at stake here: What, exactly, is drawing so many people to this bizarre conspiracy theory?"

=== Criticism ===
Following the release of the series' teaser trailer, anti-disinformation researchers and journalists expressed concerns that the series might become a recruiting tool for QAnon. Joan Donovan of Harvard's Shorenstein Center on Media, Politics and Public Policy said that its portrayal of Q as "edgy and exciting" could attract new followers.

Variety's D'Addario wrote that the series "raises certain existential questions about how, and perhaps whether, to cover misinformation campaigns". He observed that the documentary gave significant airtime to the Watkinses and others promulgating the QAnon conspiracy theory, and prominently displayed usernames and messages from QAnon personalities.

Robertson wrote in The Verge that the series "breaks several best practices for reporting on extremism", and that it "embodies all the ways that idealistic journalistic values — a devotion to humanizing subjects, a goal of exposing powerful wrongdoers, and a belief that exposing truth will set people free — fail in the face of extremist movements". Gilbert wrote for The Atlantic that "there are best practices for reporting on conspiracy theories in general, and QAnon in particular. Into the Storm flouts all of them." Bojalad wrote for Den of Geek that "Q: Into the Storm takes for granted that its viewing audience has a solid grip on reality, ignoring years of recent evidence to the contrary".

Hoback responded to the criticism by declaring that the extensive airtime given to followers of QAnon was necessary in order to show the forces behind it.

== Awards and nominations ==
Year	Association	Category	Work	Result	Ref.
2021	73rd Primetime Creative Arts Emmy Awards	Outstanding Picture Editing for a Nonfiction Program	Tom Patterson, David Tillman, Cullen Hoback, Ted Woerner, Evan Wise	Nominated	
