= BTCPay Server =

Open-source Bitcoin payment processor

- Logo of BTCPay Server, an open-source Bitcoin payment processor
- Developers: Nicolas Dorier and community contributors
- Release: August 2017; 9 years ago
- Written in: C#
- Operating system: Cross-platform
- License: MIT License
- Website: btcpayserver.org
- Repository: btcpayserver on GitHub

BTCPay Server is a free and open-source, self-hosted Bitcoin payment processor created in 2017 by Nicolas Dorier. The software allows merchants to accept bitcoin payments directly to their own wallets rather than through a centralized processor, and supports both on-chain Bitcoin and Lightning Network payments.

It was developed as an alternative to BitPay during the SegWit2x dispute in the Bitcoin community.

== History ==
During the 2017 debate over SegWit2x, a proposed change to Bitcoin's block size limit, BitPay supported the proposal, which proved divisive among Bitcoin users and developers. Dorier, who had worked as a Bitcoin consultant and previously recommended BitPay to clients, publicly criticized the company and announced he would build an alternative. He released BTCPay Server as open-source software with an API compatible with BitPay's invoice format, allowing merchants to switch with minimal code changes.

In July 2018, online travel agency CheapAir, which had accepted bitcoin since 2013, adopted BTCPay Server after Coinbase retired its merchant processing platform. CEO Jeff Klee cited greater control over the payment process and the elimination of third-party dependency as reasons for the switch.

In September 2019, the BTCPay Server Foundation was established to manage corporate contributions. Square Crypto (later renamed Spiral), the open-source arm of Jack Dorsey's payments company, awarded the project a $100,000 grant. In 2020, OKCoin contributed $100,000 and Kraken donated $150,000 in bitcoin, the foundation's largest grant at the time. Tether subsequently awarded $100,000 grants in 2024 and 2025.

In March 2021, Tesla disclosed a security vulnerability in BTCPay Server after reviewing the project's source code on GitHub and assisted the development team in patching it. Tesla had recently begun accepting bitcoin for vehicle purchases using what CEO Elon Musk described as "internal and open-source software." CoinDesk reported that traces of BTCPay's code were visible in Tesla's bitcoin checkout invoices, though BTCPay's team declined to confirm whether Tesla used the platform.

== Functionality ==
BTCPay Server provides invoice management, a built-in Bitcoin wallet with hardware wallet support, and a point of sale application. It supports payment processing via the Lightning Network and includes Tor support for privacy. A 2025 report by the European Commission's Joint Research Centre described BTCPay Server as a self-hosted bitcoin payment gateway accessed via APIs, with plugins for major content-management and e-commerce systems. Each invoice generates a new address to reduce address reuse. While the software itself does not charge processing fees beyond native Bitcoin network fees, merchants may also use shared third-party instances, which can charge monthly fees. Research on cryptocurrency web payments has found that third-party web trackers can sometimes link purchase information to specific on-chain transactions, illustrating broader privacy risks around merchant payment processing.

In April 2020, BTCPay Server integrated support for PayJoin (also known as pay-to-endpoint), a protocol in which both sender and receiver contribute inputs to a transaction. According to BIP 78, the protocol is intended to invalidate common blockchain analysis heuristics such as common-input ownership. CoinDesk described the BTCPay implementation as aimed at making merchant transactions harder to trace.

In February 2023, an optional CoinJoin plugin based on Wasabi Wallet's WabiSabi coordination protocol was added, allowing merchants to automatically mix received bitcoin with other transactions to obscure their payment histories.

Academic literature has described PayJoin, CoinJoin, and WabiSabi as privacy techniques for Bitcoin transactions, while also noting that real-world CoinJoin implementations can remain detectable and may provide less anonymity than users assume.

The software uses a plugin architecture to extend its capabilities, with over 30 plugins available as of 2025. It is written in C# and released under the MIT License. As of 2025, the project's GitHub repository had received contributions from over 170 developers and surpassed one million downloads.

== Adoption ==
=== Commercial use ===
Domain registrar Namecheap integrated BTCPay Server in 2020. By October 2024, the company reported processing over 1.1 million bitcoin transactions totaling more than $73 million in revenue from users in over 200 countries.

At the Bitcoin 2025 conference in Las Vegas, BTCPay Server was used to process 4,187 point of sale transactions in eight hours, setting a Guinness World Record for the most cryptocurrency point-of-sale transactions in that time frame. The system operated alongside traditional Square payment terminals at the event.

In December 2019, NFL player Russell Okung of the Los Angeles Chargers wore custom cleats featuring the BTCPay Server logo during a game as part of the league's "My Cause My Cleats" initiative.

=== Press freedom and human rights ===
In October 2019, the Hong Kong Free Press, a nonprofit media outlet, adopted BTCPay Server for bitcoin donations after its previous processor BitPay blocked fund transfers for several weeks during the 2019–2020 Hong Kong protests. Editor-in-chief Tom Grundy publicly criticized BitPay. He described the switch to BTCPay as allowing donors to contribute anonymously.

In March 2020, the Human Rights Foundation began accepting bitcoin donations through BTCPay Server.

During the October 2020 End SARS protests in Nigeria, the Feminist Coalition, an advocacy group, turned to BTCPay Server after Nigerian authorities froze the organization's bank accounts and shut down its access to centralized payment platforms. Alex Gladstein, chief strategy officer of the Human Rights Foundation, helped the group set up a BTCPay Server instance. He later described the tool as enabling donations from around the world while protecting donor privacy. The coalition collected approximately 3.14 BTC (roughly $36,000) within days. Quartz reported that bitcoin donations ultimately accounted for about 40 percent of the approximately $387,000 the Feminist Coalition raised during the protests. Jack Dorsey, then CEO of Twitter, promoted the Feminist Coalition's bitcoin donation page to his followers. The case was later cited in the Journal of Democracy as an example of bitcoin-based fundraising used to circumvent financial censorship.

In 2022, Bitcoin Magazine described BTCPay Server as a privacy-preserving tool for Ukrainian organizations receiving bitcoin donations during the Russian invasion of Ukraine.

== See also ==
- Bitcoin
- Lightning Network
- BitPay
- Mempool.space
- End SARS
- Feminist Coalition
