= Bitcoin Cash =

Cryptocurrency that is a fork of bitcoin

Denominations
- Code: BCH
- Precision: 10^{−8}

Development
- Implementation(s): Bitcoin Cash Node ("BCHN"); Bitcoin Unlimited ("BU"); Bitcoin Verde ("Verde"); K•th; BCHD; BCHC
- Latest release: BCHN: 28.0.1 / 29 December 2024
- Project fork of: bitcoin
- Written in: BCHN: C++ BU: C++ Verde: Java; K•th: C++ BCHD: Go; BCHC: C++
- License: BCHN: MIT; BU: MIT; Verde: MIT; K•th: MIT; BCHD: ISC; BCHC: MIT

Ledger
- Ledger start: 3 January 2009 (17 years ago)
- Split height: #478559 / 1 August 2017 (9 years ago)
- Split from: bitcoin
- Split ratio: 1:1
- Timestamping scheme: Proof-of-work (partial hash inversion)
- Hash function: SHA-256
- Issuance schedule: Block reward halved every 210,000 blocks
- Block reward: BCH 3.125 (Note: As of August 2024; halves approximately every four years.)
- Block time: 10 minutes
- Block explorer: blockchair.com/bitcoin-cash/blocks
- Circulating supply: 19,767,947 (Note: As of September 2024)
- Supply limit: 21,000,000 (Note: The supply will approach, but never reach, BCH 21 million. Issuance will permanently halt around 2140 at BCH 20,999,999.9769.)

Website
- Website: bitcoincash.org

Bitcoin Cash is a cryptocurrency that is a fork of bitcoin. Launched in 2017, Bitcoin Cash is considered an altcoin or spin-off of bitcoin. In November 2018, Bitcoin Cash further split into two separate cryptocurrencies: Bitcoin Cash (BCH) and Bitcoin Satoshi Vision (BSV).

== History ==
Since its inception, bitcoin users maintained a common set of rules for the cryptocurrency. On 21 July 2017, bitcoin miners implemented a software upgrade known as Bitcoin Improvement Proposal (BIP) 91, which activated the Segregated Witness (SegWit) upgrade at block 477,120. SegWit was a contentious update as it enabled second-layer solutions on bitcoin, such as the Lightning Network.

A group of bitcoin activists, developers, and China-based miners opposed the proposed SegWit upgrades designed to increase bitcoin's capacity; these stakeholders pushed forward alternative plans which would increase the block size limit to eight megabytes through a hard fork. Supporters of a block size increase were more committed to an on-chain medium of exchange function.

In June 2017, hardware manufacturer Bitmain described a proposed hard fork with an increased block size as a "contingency plan" in case the bitcoin community chose to implement SegWit. The same month, the first software implementation was introduced under the name Bitcoin ABC during a conference. In July 2017, the mining pool ViaBTC suggested the name Bitcoin Cash for the fork. Additionally, Roger Ver and other expressed that adopting BIP 91 (which was intended to activate SegWit) appeared to benefit those who viewed bitcoin primarily as a digital investment rather than as means of everyday transactions.

The Bitcoin Cash fork occurred on 1 August 2017, at block 478,559. Up to the previous block (478,558), the bitcoin and Bitcoin Cash blockchains were identical. This means that anyone who owned one bitcoin at the time of the fork automatically owned one unit of Bitcoin Cash. The technical difference between Bitcoin Cash and bitcoin at the time of the fork is that Bitcoin Cash supports larger block sizes. This allows the Bitcoin Cash blockchain to process more transactions per second compared to bitcoin.

Bitcoin Cash was the first of the bitcoin forks, wherein software development teams modified bitcoin's code and released coins with "bitcoin" in their names, effectively creating "money out of thin air." In relation to bitcoin, Bitcoin Cash is variously described as a spin-off, a strand, a product of a hard fork, an offshoot, a clone, a second version, or an altcoin.

In 2017 there were two factions of Bitcoin supporters: those that supported large blocks and those who preferred small blocks. The Bitcoin Cash faction favored the use of its currency as a medium of exchange for commerce, while the bitcoin-supporting faction viewed Bitcoin's primary use as that of a store of value.

On 1 August 2017, Bitcoin Cash began trading at approximately $240, while bitcoin was priced around $2,700. On 20 December 2017, Bitcoin Cash reached an intraday high of $4,355.62. However, by 23 August 2018, its price had declined by 88% to $519.12.

Gavin Andresen, a former lead Bitcoin developer endorsed Bitcoin Cash in a tweet in November 2017.

Avatar of Gavin Andresen

Gavin Andresen
(@gavinandresen)
tweeted:

Bitcoin Cash is what I started working on in 2010: a store of value AND means of exchange.

11 November 2017

In 2018, the Bitcoin Cash maximum block size was raised from 8MB to 32MB.

The anonymous @Bitcoin account on X endorsed Bitcoin Cash in 2018. The account was later briefly suspended by Twitter, possibly related to a "flood" of reports claiming "spam, hate speech, or price pumping" and brigading by some users calling on others to report it as a "fake @Bitcoin account." It was later reinstated.

In 2018 Bitcoin Core developer Cory Fields found a bug in the Bitcoin ABC software that would have allowed an attacker to create a block causing a chain split. Fields notified the development team about it, and the bug was fixed.

As of 2024, over 40 major businesses accept Bitcoin Cash in Antigua and Barbuda.

=== Regulations ===
United States regulators have stated that Bitcoin Cash should be supervised as a commodity and not under the jurisdiction of the U.S. Securities and Exchange Commission (SEC).

In 2022, Colorado began accepting Bitcoin, Bitcoin Cash, Ethereum, and Litecoin for state taxes and fee payments.

New York's legislature introduced a bill that would establish "that state agencies are allowed to accept cryptocurrencies such as bitcoin, Ethereum, Litecoin, and Bitcoin Cash as payment." The bill is currently in the assembly committee.

Gary Gensler, the former chairperson of the SEC, stated in 2018 that Bitcoin Cash does not "appear to trigger the Howey Test." Gensler also stated in a 2018 speech "over 70% of the crypto market is bitcoin, Ether, Litecoin, Bitcoin Cash. Why did I name those four? They're not securities." However, in his official capacity, neither Gensler nor the SEC have assumed these positions. Emin Gün Sirer, a professor at Cornell University, stated that Bitcoin Cash primarily focused on everyday use (largely through "grassroots, organic," merchant onboarding/adoption) whereas bitcoin had an "enormous focus on price, an enormous focus on the 'store of value' narrative".

=== Other currency forks ===
In November 2018, Bitcoin Cash experienced a contested hard fork where the project split into two cryptocurrencies: Bitcoin Cash and Bitcoin Satoshi Vision.

In November 2020, there was a second contested hard fork where the leading node implementation, BitcoinABC, created BCHA (now dubbed "eCash" or "XEC").

== Trading and usage ==
Bitcoin Cash trades on digital currency exchanges using the Bitcoin Cash name and the BCH currency code for the cryptocurrency. On 26 March 2018, OKEx removed all Bitcoin Cash trading pairs except for BCH/BTC, BCH/ETH and BCH/USDT due to "inadequate liquidity". As of May 2018, daily transaction numbers for Bitcoin Cash were about one-tenth of those of bitcoin. Coinbase listed Bitcoin Cash on 19 December 2017 and the Coinbase platform experienced price abnormalities that led to an insider trading investigation.

As of 2018, Bitcoin Cash payments are supported by payment service providers such as BitPay. Both Robinhood and Revolut added support for Bitcoin Cash.

As of 2021, PayPal has allowed users to buy, sell, hold, and checkout with Bitcoin Cash, bitcoin, ethereum, and litecoin, although PayPal users were not given the ability to transfer cryptocurrency outside of PayPal's system. In 2022, PayPal enabled the sending Bitcoin Cash off app to users' own wallets/outside services. Venmo also began supporting the cryptocurrency. In 2023, Venmo also enabled support for transferring Bitcoin Cash off platform.

As of 2021, the Dallas Mavericks accept Bitcoin Cash for payments.

In 2021, Grayscale filed for its Bitcoin Cash Trust (ticker: BCHG) to become SEC-reporting. Separately, Grayscale's Digital Large Cap (GDLC) fund includes Bitcoin Cash in its composition.

In June 2023, EDX Markets listed bitcoin, Ethereum, Bitcoin Cash, and Litecoin.

On 7 March 2024, Coinbase submitted a letter to the Commodities Futures Trading Commission (CFTC) outlining its proposal for monthly cash-settled futures contracts for Bitcoin Cash. On 1 April 2024, Coinbase Derivatives announced plans to introduce futures trading for Bitcoin Cash.

On 5 July 2024, Mt. Gox announced that it began repayments of bitcoin and Bitcoin Cash to some of its creditors.

On 10 September 2024, eToro settled with the SEC agreeing to pay fines for operating as an unregistered trading platform. As a result of this settlement, only bitcoin, Ethereum, and Bitcoin Cash will continue to be traded on the platform.

== Difficulty adjustment algorithm ==
Bitcoin Cash uses a proof-of-work algorithm to timestamp every new block. It can be described as a partial inversion of a hash function. Bitcoin Cash targets a new block to be generated every ten minutes on average. The time needed to calculate a new block is influenced by a parameter called the mining difficulty. If the total amount of mining power increases, an increase of the mining difficulty can keep the block time roughly constant. Vice versa, if the mining power decreases, a decrease of the mining difficulty can keep the block time roughly constant.

To keep the block generation time equal to ten minutes on average, Bitcoin Cash uses an algorithm adjusting the mining difficulty parameter. This algorithm is called the difficulty adjustment algorithm (DAA). Originally, both bitcoin and Bitcoin Cash used the same difficulty adjustment algorithm, adjusting the mining difficulty parameter every 2016 blocks. Since 1 August 2017, Bitcoin Cash also used an addition to the DAA, called an Emergency Difficulty Adjustment (EDA) algorithm. EDA was used alongside the original DAA and it was designed to decrease the mining difficulty of Bitcoin Cash by 20%, if the time difference between 6 successive blocks was greater than 12 hours.

EDA adjustments caused instabilities in mining difficulty of the Bitcoin Cash system, resulting in Bitcoin Cash being thousands of blocks ahead of bitcoin. To address the problem with stability, a change of the Bitcoin Cash DAA was implemented and the EDA canceled. The change took effect on 13 November 2017. After the change, the Bitcoin Cash DAA adjusts the mining difficulty after each block. To calculate the difficulty for a new block, the Bitcoin Cash DAA uses a moving window of last 144 blocks.

== See also ==
- Bitcoin scalability problem
- List of bitcoin forks
- List of cryptocurrencies
