= Mempool.space =

Open-source Bitcoin application

- Original authors: Wiz and softsimon
- Developer: The Mempool Open Source Project
- Release: 2018; 8 years ago
- Written in: TypeScript, Rust
- Operating system: Cross-platform
- Platform: Web
- Type: Blockchain explorer
- License: AGPL-3.0
- Website: mempool.space
- Repository: github.com/mempool/mempool

Mempool.space is an open-source Bitcoin blockchain explorer and mempool visualizer developed by The Mempool Open Source Project. It was created in 2018 by the pseudonymous developers Wiz and softsimon. The software provides information on unconfirmed Bitcoin transactions, fee estimates, blocks, and mining activity. It later expanded to include explorers for the Lightning Network and the Liquid Network.

== History ==
Mempool.space was started in 2018 by softsimon and later developed together with Wiz. In April 2021, Square Crypto awarded the project a grant valued at approximately $100,000, while cryptocurrency exchange Gemini provided an additional $25,000 sponsorship. In August 2021, Foundry, a subsidiary of Digital Currency Group, donated 1 BTC and said it would support development of mining-related features for the site.

In July 2024, the project launched the Mempool Accelerator transaction acceleration service. In October 2024, the addition of filters identifying Ordinals- and Runes-related transactions led to debate within parts of the Bitcoin community.

In November 2025, Mempool announced that it had incorporated Mempool Holdings in El Salvador and would relocate its global headquarters there. In January 2026, Diario El Salvador reported that the move was backed by an investment round of approximately $17 million led by Fulgur Ventures.

== Functionality ==
The software's main interface displays unconfirmed Bitcoin transactions in a visualized mempool, along with recent blocks, fee estimates, and transaction status information. It also provides mining statistics, including a block audit feature that compares expected and actual block contents, and explorers for the Lightning Network and the Liquid Network.

In July 2024, the project launched the Mempool Accelerator, a service that allows users to pay an off-chain fee to partner mining pools to expedite confirmation of pending transactions. The Block reported that the initial partner pools comprised approximately 40% of Bitcoin's global hashrate, and that the service was intended as an alternative to on-chain fee-bumping methods such as replace-by-fee and child-pays-for-parent. The service accepts payment via the Lightning Network or fiat currency, and doesn't require an account. It operates as an off-chain intermediary rather than through Bitcoin's native peer-to-peer transaction mechanism.

The software can also be self-hosted and is distributed under the AGPL-3.0 license.

== Reception ==
The government of El Salvador operates a custom instance of the software at bitcoin.gob.sv to publicly display its Bitcoin reserves. Bloomberg News reported in May 2024 that El Salvador had launched the tracking site in partnership with mempool.space. In December 2025, NYSE-listed Twenty One Capital stated in a filing with the SEC that it would publish on-chain proof of its Bitcoin holdings through a custom mempool.space instance.

Publications including Fortune and The Block have cited the software as a data source for reporting on Bitcoin network activity such as the April 2024 halving.

A 2026 academic paper funded by the German Research Foundation analyzed mempool.space's block audit functionality as a case study for mempool-based transaction auditing, finding that such approaches can assist in detecting transaction displacement attacks but may also produce false accusations against miners.

A May 2025 analysis in Bitcoin Magazine discussed the project's Accelerator as an example of out-of-band transaction submission infrastructure, noting implications for mining revenue distribution and the role of third-party intermediaries in Bitcoin's fee market.

In October 2024, Blockspace Media reported on community criticism following the addition of transaction filters for Ordinals and Runes, describing the dispute as part of a broader debate over how Bitcoin-related services should present non-monetary uses of the blockchain.

== See also ==
- Bitcoin
- Lightning Network
- Bitcoin in El Salvador
