= List of bitcoin forks =

Bitcoin forks are defined variantly as changes in the protocol of the Bitcoin network or as the situations that occur "when two or more blocks have the same block height". A fork influences the validity of the rules. Forks are typically conducted in order to add new features to a blockchain, to reverse the effects of hacking or catastrophic bugs. Forks require consensus to be resolved or else a permanent split emerges.

According to BIP 123 specifications, there are 3 main categories of Bitcoin forks:

- Soft Forks within Bitcoin: These don't split the network. These are consensus rule changes where some previously-valid blocks are now invalid.
- Hard Forks within Bitcoin: These cause a permanent chain split between the 2 versions. These are consensus rule changes where some previously-invalid blocks are now valid.
- Hard Forks that created alternative blockchains and cryptocurrencies.

There is also another subcategory of consensus rule changes that had a chance to cause a hard fork and chain split. However, because they were never exploited, they technically never resulted in a hard fork.

== Soft Forks within Bitcoin ==
These are consensus rule changes that did not cause a split in the network. These are the result of consensus rule changes where previously-valid blocks are now invalid in newer clients. Client nodes both with and without the update can still build on the same chain. Two of the most well-known Bitcoin soft forks are Segwit and Taproot.

=== Segwit ===
Segregated Witness (SegWit), formally known as Segregated Witness (Consensus layer), is an implemented soft fork change in the transaction format of bitcoin.

SegWit had Bitcoin Improvement Proposal number BIP 141. The declared purpose was to prevent nonintentional bitcoin transaction malleability; allow optional data transmission; and to bypass certain protocol restrictions (such as the block size limit) with a soft fork. Segregated Witness was activated on 24 August 2017.

=== Taproot ===
Taproot is an agreed soft fork in the transaction format. The fork adds support for Schnorr signatures, and improves functionality of smart contracts and the Lightning Network. The fork was installed in November 2021. The upgrade adds privacy features. Taproot includes BIP numbers 340, 341, 342.

Advantages:

- Complex transactions, such as those requiring multiple signatures or those with delayed release, are indistinguishable from simple transactions in terms of on-chain data.
- Reduced transaction costs: The data size of complex Bitcoin transactions is reduced, which leads to lower transaction fees.
- Support for more complicated conditions for a transaction via Schnorr signatures.
- Benefits for the Lightning Network: More flexibility, privacy enhancement, lower costs.

== Hard Forks within Bitcoin ==
These are Hard Forks within Bitcoin that caused a chain split but did not create an alternative network or cryptocurrency. These are consensus rule changes where some previously-invalid blocks are now valid in newer clients.

- v0.3.6: The addition of OP_NOP functions eventually caused a chain split. Clients prior to 0.3.6 can no longer sync with the current Bitcoin blockchain after block 163,685.
- March 2013 Chain Fork. The migration from BerkeleyDB to LevelDB in v0.8 caused a chain split. Miners reorged 24-blocks by switching back to v0.7.2. At least one double-spend occurred during this event. This bug was later fixed in v0.8.1.

== Hard Forks that created alternative blockchains and cryptocurrencies ==
These are Hard Forks created via consensus rule changes that created an alternative blockchain and cryptocurrency. They share a transaction history with Bitcoin up to a certain time and date. The first hard fork splitting bitcoin happened on 1 August 2017, resulting in the creation of Bitcoin Cash.

The following is a list of notable hard forks splitting bitcoin by date and/or block:

- Bitcoin Cash: Forked at block 478558, 1 August 2017, for each bitcoin (BTC), an owner got 1 Bitcoin Cash (BCH)
- Bitcoin Gold: Forked at block 491407, 24 October 2017, for each bitcoin (BTC), an owner got 1 Bitcoin Gold (BTG)
- Bitcoin Satoshi Vision: Forked at block 556766, 15 November 2018, for each Bitcoin Cash (BCH), an owner got 1 Bitcoin SV (BSV).
- eCash: Forked at block 661648, 15 November 2020, for each Bitcoin Cash (BCH), an owner got 1,000,000 eCash (XEC).

Bitcoin Classic
In its first 8 months, Bitcoin Classic promoted a single increase of the maximum block size from one megabyte to two megabytes. In November 2016 this changed and the project moved to a solution that moved the limit out of the software rules into the hands of the miners and nodes.
Bitcoin Unlimited

All three software clients attempt to increase transaction capacity of the network. None achieved a majority of the hash power.

== Software forks of Bitcoin Core without a blockchain ==
The following are proposed software forks of the Bitcoin Core software client that did not successfully launch a blockchain:

Bitcoin XT
A fork initiated by Mike Hearn. The current reference implementation for bitcoin contains a computational bottleneck. The actual fork was preceded by Mike Hearn publishing BIP 64 on June 10, 2014, calling for the addition of "a small P2P protocol extension that performs UTXO lookups given a set of outpoints." On December 27, 2014 Hearn released version 0.10 of the forked client XT, with the BIP 64 changes. It achieved significant attention within the bitcoin community in mid-2015 amid a contentious debate among core developers over increasing the block size cap.

On June 22, 2015, Gavin Andresen published BIP 101 calling for an increase in the maximum block size. The changes would activate a fork allowing eight MB blocks (doubling in size every two years) once 75% of a stretch of 1,000 mined blocks is achieved after the beginning of 2016. The new maximum transaction rate under XT would have been 24 transactions per second.

On August 6, 2015 Andresen's BIP 101 proposal was merged into the XT codebase. BIP 101 was reverted and the 2-MB block size bump of Bitcoin Classic was applied instead.

The August 2015 release of XT received widespread media coverage. The Guardian wrote that "bitcoin is facing civil war".

Wired wrote that "Bitcoin XT exposes the extremely social—extremely democratic—underpinnings of the open source idea, an approach that makes open source so much more powerful than technology controlled by any one person or organization." Developer Adam Back was critical of the 75% activation threshold being too low and that some of the changes were insecure.

On August 25, 2017, Bitcoin XT published Release G, which was a Bitcoin Cash client by default. Subsequently, Release H was published, which supported the November 2017 Bitcoin Cash protocol upgrade, followed by Release I, which supported the May 2018 Bitcoin Cash protocol upgrade.

== Potential hard forks that were never exploited ==
These are client consensus updates that could have potentially caused a hard fork. They were either never exploited before being patched, or were reverted by a reorg before they were patched.

- CVE-2010-5139: There was a value overflow bug that was exploited when a transaction minted 184B bitcoins. Miners reorged the blockchain to remove the minting transaction, causing a chain split. Because the reorg occurred before wxBitcoin v0.3.11 was released to fix the bug, it technically was not a hard fork.
- CVE-2018-17144: Bitcoin 0.15 had a critical inflation bug that allowed double spending certain inputs in the same block. This was not exploited before being patched.
