= Bitcoin scalability =

Bitcoin's ability to handle transaction volume

The Lightning Network is a secondary network designed to address bitcoin scalability

Bitcoin scalability refers to the capability of the Bitcoin network to handle large amounts of transaction data on its platform. Records (known as blocks) in the Bitcoin blockchain are limited in size and frequency to prioritize security and decentralization by keeping the cost of running a Bitcoin node affordable. With an average block creation time of 10 minutes and a block size limit of around 1 megabyte, the base layer processes an estimated 3.3 to 7 transactions per second.

Scalability is often contrasted with security and decentralization.

The term "Layer 2" is used for systems, such as the Lightning Network, which process multiple transactions more quickly using a separate network and then updating the bitcoin blockchain in batches.

== Background ==
The block size limit, and the proof-of-work difficulty adjustment settings of bitcoin's consensus protocol, creates a bottleneck in bitcoin's transaction processing capacity. This can result in increased transaction fees and delayed processing of transactions that cannot be fit into a block. Proposals for how to scale bitcoin have led to contentious debate. Business Insider in 2017 characterized this debate as an "ideological battle over bitcoin's future."

== Efficiency improvements ==
Technical optimizations may decrease the amount of computing resources required to receive, process and record bitcoin transactions, allowing increased throughput without placing extra demand on the bitcoin network. These modifications can be to either the network, in which case a fork is required, or to individual node software (such as Bitcoin Core).

- Schnorr signatures have been proposed as a scaling system by Blockstream co-founder Pieter Wuille.
- A 2006 paper by Mihir Bellare enables signature aggregation in O(1) size, which means that it will not take more space to have multiple signers. Bellare-Neven reduces to Schnorr for a single key. Bellare-Neven has been implemented.

== Additional systems ==
A Lightning Network overview

The Lightning Network (LN) is a protocol that aims to improve bitcoin's scalability and speed.

In January 2018 Blockstream launched a payment processing system for web retailers called "Lightning Charge", noted that lightning was live on mainnet with 200 nodes operating as of 27 January 2018 and advised it should still be considered "in testing". The Liquid Network is a sidechain that Blockstream developed which is built on top of Bitcoin. It processes blocks every minute instead of every 10 minutes.

As part of a government program to expand the use of Bitcoin in El Salvador, the El Salvador introduced a wallet based on the Lightning Network protocol while allowing for other Bitcoin Lightning wallets. The government distributed US$30 in bitcoin to people who sign up to use an electronic wallet called "Chivo". Chivo was run by a private enterprise, but information regarding the platform and its policies were classified by the government. In December, 2024, El Salvador, in an agreement for a $1.4 billion loan from the IMF, the government began to wind-down its involvement in the Chivo wallet.

== Block size increases ==
Bitcoin's transaction throughput is limited by two parameters:

- the block time determines how often a new block is added to the chain,
- the block size determines the amount of data that can be added with every block.

Bitcoin has a block time of 10 minutes and a block size of 1 MB. Various increases to this limit, and proposals to remove it completely, have been proposed over bitcoin's history. Implementing any of these proposals involves a fork. The common argument against such increases is the additional difficulty and expense of running a full node (i.e. one carrying the entire distributed ledger). This is due to the increased overall size of the ledger, which puts puts pressure on the node in terms of both RAM and storage space.

Litecoin produces blocks four times faster than Bitcoin which leads to a 4x improvement in throughput. Dogecoin has even more throughput with a block time of 1 minute. Bitcoin Cash has a block size of 32 MB and hence 32x more throughput than Bitcoin. Bitcoin SV removed the block size limit altogether.

=== Proposed ===
- Bitcoin XT was proposed in 2015 to increase the transaction processing capacity of bitcoin by increasing the block size limit.
- Bitcoin Classic was proposed in 2016 to increase the transaction processing capacity of bitcoin by increasing the block size limit.
- "The Hong Kong Agreement" was a 2016 agreement of some miners and developers that contained a timetable that would see both the activation of the Segregated Witness (SegWit) proposal established in December 2015 by Bitcoin Core developers, and the development of a block size limit increased to 2 MB. However, both timelines were missed.
- SegWit2x was a proposed hard fork of the cryptocurrency bitcoin. The implementation of Segregated Witness in August 2017 was only the first half of the so-called "New York Agreement" by which those who wanted to increase effective block size by SegWit compromised with those who wanted to increase block size by a hard fork to a larger block size. The second half of SegWit2x involved a hard fork in November 2017 to increase the blocksize to 2 megabytes. On 8 November 2017 the developers of SegWit2x announced that the hard fork planned for around 16 November 2017 was canceled for the time being due to a lack of consensus.
- Bitcoin Unlimited advocated for miner flexibility to increase the block size limit. This proposal is different from Bitcoin Core in that the block size parameter is not hard-coded, and rather the nodes and miners flag support for the size that they want, using an idea they refer to as 'emergent consensus'.

== See also ==
- Software development
- List of bitcoin forks
