= Andreas Antonopoulos =

British-Greek Bitcoin advocate (born 1972)

Andreas Markos Antonopoulos
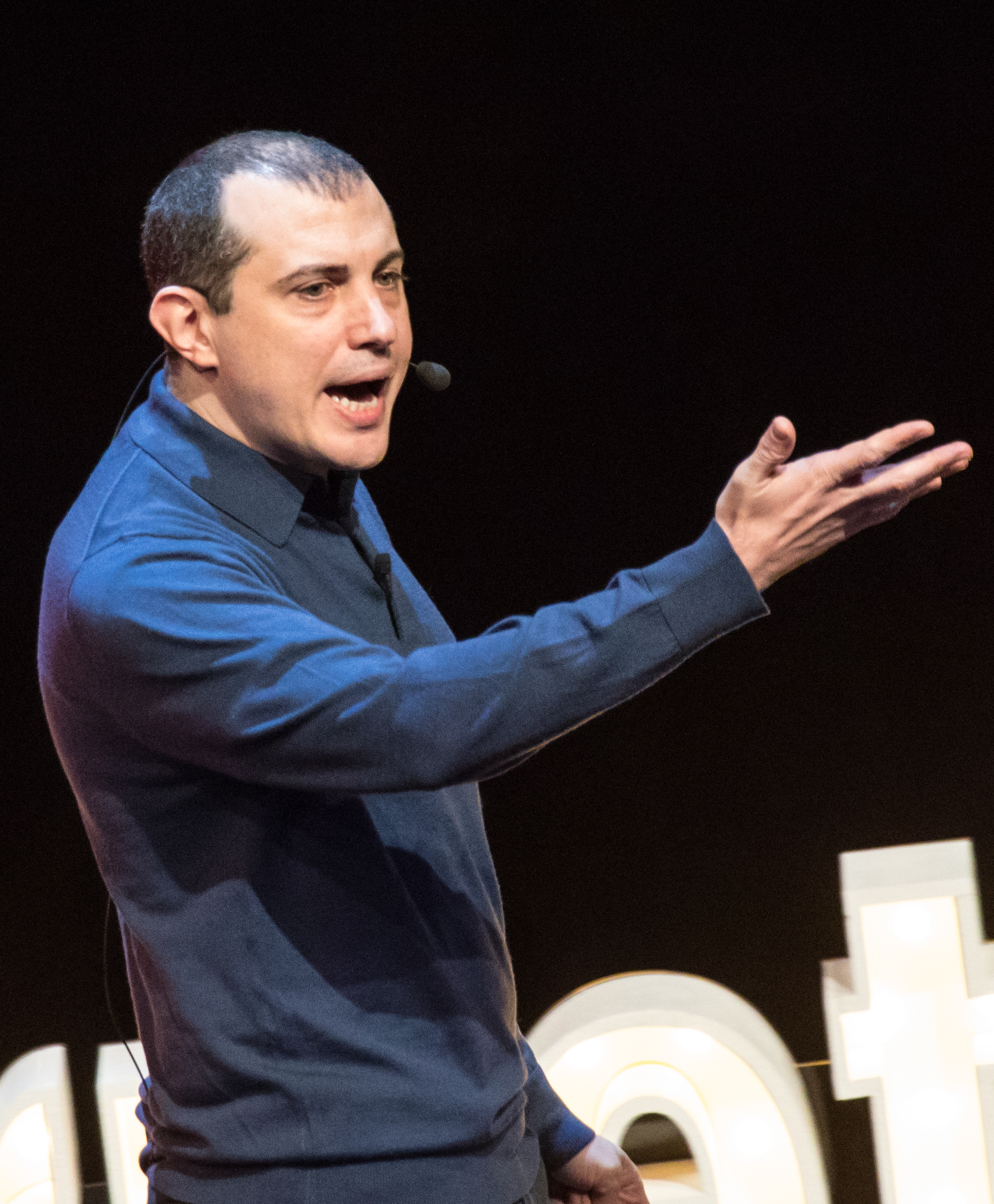
- Antonopoulos presenting at Internetdagarna 2017 in Stockholm
- Born: 1972 (age 53–54); London, England
- Education: University College London
- Occupation: Tech entrepreneur
- Website: aantonop.com

Andreas Markos Antonopoulos (Greek: Ανδρέας Μάρκος Αντωνόπουλος; born 1972 in London) is a British-Greek early bitcoin advocate, tech entrepreneur, and author. He is a host on the Speaking of Bitcoin podcast (formerly called Let's Talk Bitcoin!) and a teaching fellow for the M.Sc. Digital Currencies at the University of Nicosia.

== Early life and education ==
Antonopoulos was born in 1972 in London, UK, and moved to Athens, Greece during the Greek Junta. He spent his childhood there, and at the age of 17 returned to the UK. Antonopoulos obtained his degrees in Computer science and Data Communications, Networks and Distributed Systems from University College London.

== Career ==
=== Nemertes Research ===
He was Senior Vice President and a Founding Partner with Nemertes Research, from 2003 until 2011. While there, Antonopoulos researched computer security, stating that the greatest threat to computer security was not experienced hackers, but overly complex systems that resulted from rapid change in business.

Antonopoulos introducing bitcoin in 2016

=== Bitcoin involvement ===
In 2012, Antonopoulos became enamored with bitcoin. He eventually abandoned his job as a freelance consultant and started speaking at conferences about bitcoin, consulting for startups, and writing articles free of charge.

According to his podcast, Antonopoulos is a consultant on several bitcoin-related startups.

In January 2014, Antonopoulos joined Blockchain.info as chief security officer. In September 2014, he left the CSO role.

In April 2014, Antonopoulos organised a fundraising campaign for Dorian Nakamoto, who was identified in a Newsweek article as the creator of bitcoin, Satoshi Nakamoto. The reporting techniques used in the article were controversial among journalists and Bitcoin community members. The fundraiser, intended to assist Nakamoto after the attention he received as a result of the article, raised 50 bitcoins, worth US$23,000 at the time.

On 8 October 2014, Antonopoulos spoke in front of the Banking, Trade and Commerce committee of the Senate of Canada to address the senators' questions on how to regulate bitcoin in Canada.

In March 2016, the first edition of Mastering Bitcoin was released by Antonopoulos, in print and online, followed by a second edition in June 2017.

In December 2017, unsolicited donations of over 100 bitcoins were sent to Antonopoulos by over a thousand followers of his work, after Roger Ver made a public post to Twitter on 5 December questioning Antonopoulos's investment choices given his "eloquent" public speaking about bitcoin since 2012.

In 2026, he paused his podcast after 14 years, citing severe migraine headaches. He will not produce any further livestreams or Q&A content.

== Bibliography ==
=== Books ===
- Mastering Bitcoin: Unlocking Digital Currencies (2014, O'Reilly) ISBN 978-1449374044
- Mastering Bitcoin 2nd Edition: Programming the Open Blockchain (2017, O'Reilly) ISBN 978-1491954386
- Mastering Ethereum: Building Smart Contracts and dApps (2018, O'Reilly) ISBN 978-1491971949
- The Internet of Money (Volume 1) (2016, O'Reilly) ISBN 978-1537000459
- The Internet of Money (Volume 2) (2017, Merkle Bloom, self-published) ISBN 978-1947910065
- The Internet of Money (Volume 3) (2019, Merkle Bloom, self-published) ISBN 978-1947910171
