= SREDIM =

SREDIM is a method of task analysis. It is an acronym derived from the words select, record, examine, develop, install/implement and maintain. This problem solving method's analysis system can be used to analyze any process to determine parts of the process which are inefficient, or can be improved.

== Select ==
This phase begins by choosing the parts of the process to study, identifying bottlenecks, and data to collect, etc. The "bottleneck" is not necessarily just a pinch point in the work flow typically found in production processes. It can also be identified as any task or part of the process that falls below the anticipated or predetermined standard.

Therefore, the step must also consider, poor quality, imbalance in work content between processes (typical on textile production lines), lack of raw material supply, machine malfunction, lack of meaningful standard operating procedures or adequate training.

It's required to consider all of the above in the "selection" process, i.e. something that is affecting the normal function of the system or task under review.

== Record ==
This part of the process is based around taking details of the different parts of the process which is to be studied, as defined in part 1. Record the facts and differentiate between facts, assumptions, and opinions.

== Examine ==
Analyse the data that has been collected and apply another acronym to it, PPSPM:

Purpose	What and why is each thing being done?
Place	Why is this process being done there, could it be done elsewhere?
Sequence	When is this process being done, and why then?
Person	Who does this process? What training do they require, could someone else do it more efficiently?
Means	How is it done, and could the process itself be done more efficiently?

== Develop ==
When the problems and issues have been identified, this is the stage to create a new method or process based on data collected. Develop an alternative solution.

== Install or Implement ==
The new method which has been put together must be costed and installed for it to work

== Maintain ==
While it takes a lot of effort to create a new method, for it to continue working, processes must be put in place to ensure that the system continues working.

== Sources ==
- "BOLA Operations Method work study". Archived from the original on 2011-09-11.
