= Internet bottleneck =

Internet bottlenecks are places in telecommunication networks in which internet service providers (ISPs), or naturally occurring high use of the network, slow or alter the network speed of the users and/or content producers using that network. A bottleneck is a more general term for a system that has been reduced or slowed due to limited resources or components. The bottleneck occurs in a network when there are too many users attempting to access a specific resource. Internet bottlenecks provide artificial and natural network choke points to inhibit certain sets of users from overloading the entire network by consuming too much bandwidth. Theoretically, this will lead users and content producers through alternative paths to accomplish their goals while limiting the network load at any one time. (Note: An example of this type of management can be found at the Comcast page for understanding network management.) Alternatively, internet bottlenecks have been seen as a way for ISPs to take advantage of their dominant market-power increasing rates for content providers to push past bottlenecks. The United States Federal Communications Commission (FCC) has created regulations stipulating that artificial bottlenecks are in direct opposition to a free and open Internet.

== Technical details ==
The technical reasons for Internet bottlenecks are largely related to network congestion in which the user experiences a delay in delivering or accessing content. The bottlenecks can occur naturally, during high network use, or artificially created by owners of the network, generally considered to be ISPs, in order to prevent the network from experiencing overload.

The network demands of users continues to grow and with it so do the pressures on networks. The way current technologies process information over the network is slow and consumes large amounts of energy. ISPs and engineers argue that these issues with the increased demand on the networks result in some necessary congestion, but the bottlenecks also occur because of the lack of technology to handle such huge data needs using minimal energy. There are attempts being made to increase the speed, amount of data, and reduce power consumption of the networks. For example, optical memory devices could be used in the future to send and receive light signals working much faster and more efficiently than electrical signals. Some researchers see optical memory as needed to reduce the demands on the network routers in data transmission, while others do not. The research will continue to explore possibilities for greater network bandwidth and data transfer. As data consumption needs increase, so will the need for better technology that facilitates the transfer and storage of that data.

Deep packet inspection (DPI) may also be used to address network congestion through recognition of a specific set of protocols, services, or users. ISPs may then manipulate the bandwidth allocation for those groups by reducing it to maintain the network stability and available bandwidth for the entire network.

Network congestion or Internet bottleneck generally occurs and is felt by users in homes and businesses. This is what is known as the last mile of transmission, which is when there is not enough bandwidth available for individual users to access the content they want. Everyone is attempting to use the bandwidth at the same time creating an Internet traffic jam.

== Political details ==
In terms of public policy, Internet bottlenecks and/or network congestion has largely been nested within the network neutrality debate. Network neutrality is the notion that ISPs and content providers need to be regulated in order to maintain fair speeds and access to content for all Internet users. Internet bottlenecks had been perceived as useful facets of network management, but ISPs have throttled specific types of uses of their networks that have little to do with network management and more to do with network neutrality.

New regulatory rules were established by the FCC in order to enforce fair network management practices by ISPs. The rules were established on September 23, 2011, and took effect November 20, 2011. This new set of regulations has three primary rules:

1. "Transparency. Fixed and mobile broadband providers must disclose the network management practices, performance characteristics, and terms and conditions of their broadband services;
2. "No blocking. Fixed broadband providers may not block lawful content, applications, services, or non-harmful devices; mobile broadband providers may not block lawful Web sites, or block applications that compete with their voice or video telephony services; and
3. "No unreasonable discrimination. Fixed broadband providers may not unreasonably discriminate in transmitting lawful network traffic."

Of these rules, set up by the FCC, only number 2 and number 3 apply to network bottlenecks. Network bottlenecks represent a specific part of that policy discussion in which ISPs are able to create network flows that are slower for competitors possibly leading customers to go to another website that is more easily accessed, which gives the parent or children companies of the ISPs an advantage. Thus, in the FCC's rule number 2 and 3 there are specific requirements that ISPs do not discriminate or restrict services to those companies who offer competing services similar to the ISP's services.

Alternatively, ISPs argue that the bottlenecks are necessary to create artificial control points that create a better experience for all users and content providers creating a more fair and balanced network system. Thus, there is a market-based approach to addressing the issue of bottlenecking by allowing the market to choose from other ISPs that are providing better network speeds, which may force the ISPs using Internet bottlenecks to reduce or remove the bottlenecks.

The interested parties in this political issue include:

1. ISPs - whose interest is to maintain profitability while maintaining quality service to a loyal consumer and content provider base.
2. Advocacy groups - their goal is to regulate the ISPs. Advocacy groups believe the ISPs are misusing a public good that should be equally distributed to all people and organizations.
3. Content provider - the institution that creates content on the web and distributes that content through networks belonging to ISPs.
4. Individual consumer - the average person in the United States, who has home access to the Internet, wireless smart phone data use, or any other Internet access.

=== Pro-regulation ===
Organizations, such as the U.S. advocacy organization Free Press, argue that Internet bottlenecks are unnecessary and used by ISPs to arbitrarily lead users to alternate websites, which may or may not be companies of the ISPs. Groups like Free Press, Consumer Federation of America, and Consumers Union argue that the ISPs have no reason to remove bottlenecks from the network. The ISPs can charge more money to content providers to push past the Internet bottleneck. However, Free Press argues that ISPs could alleviate bottlenecks for all by increasing available bandwidth. Advocacy groups are not the only arm of pro-regulation; Google and other companies like Facebook and Wikipedia support regulatory policy that stops ISPs from placing network bottlenecks on content providers and consumers, which would force content providers to pay extra. The network neutrality rules mentioned above address the concerns of pro-regulatory groups, but are seen as somewhat weak with apparent loopholes.

=== Anti-regulation ===
Companies that oppose the regulation of Internet bottlenecks include Comcast and AT&T. They argue that Internet bottlenecks are a part of the network management strategy of which cannot be eliminated due to ever increasing data demands. Thus, it may be necessary at some points to throttle or restrict certain users who are consuming too much bandwidth to allow other users to have equal access. These users have their bandwidth restored once the bottleneck has been reduced.

Charges were made against Comcast by the FCC originally brought up by Free Press and others, who claimed that Comcast was purposely degrading the network speed for certain uses of the network, most notably the use of P2P file sharing from services like BitTorrent.

== Network management ==
Network management is the administration, operation and maintenance of a network. Network management is one of the primary arguments used by ISPs in support of reducing Internet bottlenecks. Both Comcast and At&t cite the use of different techniques in reducing bottlenecks, whether that be throttling certain users or reducing speeds for certain websites. (Note: See "network management" practices in the Comcast and At&t terms of service.) While the ISPs argue that bottlenecks can be removed through increased bandwidth availability that can never catch up with ever-increasing bandwidth demand, pro-regulatory groups see bottlenecks as a beneficial form of network slowdown that enables ISPs to charge more money to users and content providers who wish to move past the bottleneck.

ISPs have proposed and have implemented in some cases a tiered service plan allowing users and content providers to pay for premium network lines. These tiered service plans are meant to reduce network congestion at certain levels of bandwidth by allowing high level users to purchase and have access to more available bandwidth. Further, the plans charge based on usage. The more data used the higher the bill would be. Tiered service is common practice among wireless providers, but it is expected that wired connections may soon see usage charges as well, which according to David Hyman will decrease the competitiveness of the open market.

=== The role of government ===
The United States Federal Communications Commission (FCC) was tasked with designing and maintaining an internationally competitive national broadband system by implementing a National Broadband Plan. This plan has largely succeeded in improving the overall infrastructure and access to broadband internet. As mentioned in the political details section above, the FCC is now responsible for making sure established rules and regulations are followed. The FCC is further tasked with increasing broadband use through a newer initiative called the Connect America Fund. This fund is meant to reduce wasteful spending, while improving the original Universal Service Fund.

The new rules became active November 20, 2011. Since then Verizon has filed lawsuits against the FCC claiming the FCC is overstepping the bounds of the commission, but the United States Senate and United States House of Representatives voted in favor of the Net Neutrality regulations.

=== From the content provider's perspective ===
Content providers are actors who have specific interest in gaining as much Internet traffic as possible, but they also have other competitors from other content providers. Advocacy groups argue that content providers need regulated fair access, while some content providers support this, others recommend a free-market system as suggested by Free Press. Those who can afford to bypass any Internet bottleneck will then have an advantage in network speeds, but will have to pay for it.

Subsequently, in some cases, peering, creating a physical connection between two networks to avoid other network transit services, has been used to bypass Internet bottlenecks by the user and content provider. There is some speculation that if there is no regulation of Internet bottlenecks, both users and content providers will simply create systems like peering to navigate around ISPs effectively neutralizing them. This may also lead to network security risks that would enable.

Netflix has accused Comcast of violating the new Net Neutrality rules by not counting Comcast's Xfinity video service against the monthly data allotment of 250gb, but counting the use of Netflix or any other video service monthly data allotment.

=== From the user's perspective ===
Users access the Internet through telecommunications devices in which they purchase a type of Internet service to use that device. Individual users are given limited access to the information about their Internet access other than the download and upload speeds. Further, they are not generally told when their use of the network experiences a bottleneck nor are they told about the actual speeds at which their Internet will function. Greater information for the user has been requested in the new FCC rules, but it is not known whether or not ISPs are providing fully accurate information as the data is generally aggregated or "cherry-picked" for better examples. Center for Democracy and Technology has recommended that users would benefit from the ability to "test the actual performance of their broadband services."

Wireless broadband users also have limited capacity to file court claims against ISPs. In the case of At&t Mobility LLC vs. Concepcion Et Ux. (2012), the U.S. Supreme Court ruled that there could be no class action lawsuit against At&t. Thus, Marguerite Rearden of CNet argues that this Supreme Court decision will limit the future power of any individual in trying to fight back against wireless providers because every wireless provider stipulates in their terms of service that class action suits are not allowed. Any type of overuse of the network will result in some sort of throttling of the user's plan in an attempt by the ISP to limit network congestion, with no warning or notification despite having an unlimited plan.
