= Bitcoin Core =

Bitcoin node and wallet software

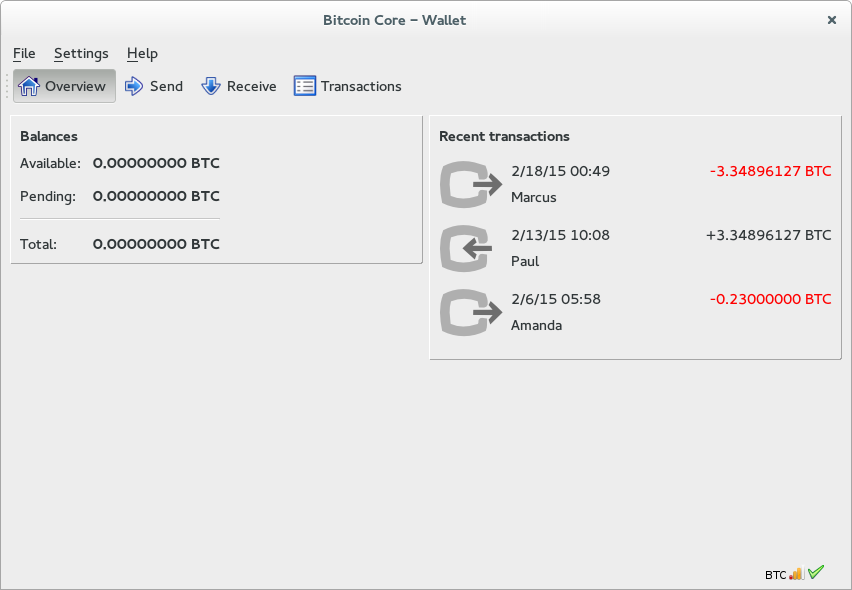
- The start screen under Fedora Linux
- Original author: Satoshi Nakamoto
- Release: 2009
- Stable release: 30.2 (10 January 2026; 7 months ago) [±]
- Written in: C++
- Operating system: Linux, Windows, macOS
- Type: Cryptocurrency
- License: MIT License
- Website: bitcoincore.org
- Repository: github.com/bitcoin/bitcoin

Bitcoin Core is free and open-source software that serves as a bitcoin node (the set of which form the Bitcoin network) and provides a bitcoin wallet which fully verifies payments. It is considered to be bitcoin's reference implementation. Initially, the software was published by Satoshi Nakamoto under the name "Bitcoin", and later renamed to "Bitcoin Core" to distinguish it from the network. It is also known as the Satoshi client. Bitcoin Core includes a transaction verification engine and connects to the bitcoin network as a full node. As of 2013, peer-reviewed measurements of the Bitcoin network's message propagation showed that new blocks reach 95% of nodes within about 40 seconds and a median delay of 12.6 seconds, underscoring the importance of efficient node software such as Bitcoin Core.

The software validates the entire blockchain, which includes all bitcoin transactions ever. This distributed ledger, which has reached more than 608.9 gigabytes (not including database indexes) in size as of October 2024, must be downloaded or synchronized before full participation of the client may occur. Bitcoin Core includes a scripting language inspired by Forth that can define transactions and specify parameters.

The original creator of the bitcoin client has described their approach to the software's authorship as it being written first to prove to themselves that the concept of purely peer-to-peer electronic cash was valid and that a paper with solutions could be written. Gavin Andresen was the former lead maintainer for the software client. Andresen left the role of lead developer for bitcoin to work on the strategic development of its technology. Wladimir J. van der Laan took over as lead maintainer on 8 April 2014 and held the role until August 2022, when he stepped back from the project, citing burnout and a desire to further decentralize the project's governance. Van der Laan removed his own merge privileges in February 2023, and the role of lead maintainer has remained vacant since his departure; Bitcoin Core is now maintained by a group of developers with commit access. Bitcoin Core in 2015 was central to a dispute with Bitcoin XT, a competing client that sought to increase the blocksize.

Bitcoin Core development is funded by a number of organizations and grant programs. In 2019, the MIT Media Lab announced donations of $900,000 would be used to fund the Digital Currency Initiative, which would mainly go to developers of Bitcoin Core.
