= Lightning Network =

Payment protocol for Bitcoin

Logo for bitcoin sent over the Lightning Network

The Lightning Network (LN) is a payment protocol built on the bitcoin blockchain. It is intended to enable fast transactions among participating nodes (independently run members of the network) and has been proposed as a solution to the bitcoin scalability problem.

== History ==
Joseph Poon and Thaddeus Dryja published a Lightning Network white paper in February 2015.

Lightning Labs launched the Lightning Network in 2018 with the goal of reducing the cost and time required for cryptocurrency transactions. Specifically, the bitcoin blockchain can only process around 7 transactions per second (compared to Visa Inc., which can process around 24,000 transactions per second). Despite initial enthusiasm for the Lightning Network, reports on social media of failed transactions, security vulnerabilities, and over-complication led to a decline in interest.

The three major Lightning Network implementations are Lightning Network Daemon (LND) by Lightning Labs, Core Lightning (CLN) by Blockstream, and Eclair by ACINQ. A fourth implementation library, Lightning Development Kit (LDK), is maintained by Spiral, a subsidiary of Block, Inc.

On January 19, 2019, pseudonymous Twitter user hodlonaut began a game-like promotional test of the Lightning Network by sending 100,000 satoshis (0.001 bitcoin) to a trusted recipient where each recipient added 10,000 satoshis ($0.34 at the time) to send to the next trusted recipient. The "lightning torch" payment reached notable personalities including former Twitter A.K.A X CEO Jack Dorsey, Litecoin Creator Charlie Lee, Lightning Labs CEO Elizabeth Stark, and Binance CEO "CZ" Changpeng Zhao, among others.

== Design ==
Andreas Antonopoulos calls the Lightning Network a second layer routing network. The payment channels allow participants to transfer money to each other without having to make all their transactions public on the blockchain. This is secured by penalizing uncooperative participants. When opening a channel, participants must commit an amount on the blockchain (a funding transaction). Time-based script extensions like CheckSequenceVerify and CheckLockTimeVerify make the penalties possible.

Transacting parties use the Lightning Network by opening a payment channel and transferring (committing) funds to the relevant layer-1 blockchain (e.g. bitcoin) under a smart contract. The parties then make any number of off-chain Lightning Network transactions that update the tentative distribution of the channel's funds, without broadcasting to the blockchain. Whenever the parties have finished their transaction session, they close the payment channel, and the smart contract distributes the committed funds according to the transaction record.

== Implementations ==
=== Benefits ===
According to bitcoin advocate Andreas Antonopoulos, the Lightning Network provides several advantages over on-chain transactions:

- Granularity – According to Andreas Antonopoulos, some implementations of the Lightning Network allow for payments that are smaller than a satoshi, the smallest unit on the base layer of bitcoin.
- Privacy – Lightning network payments may be routed through many sequential channels where each node operator will be able to see payments across their channels, but they will not be able to see the source nor destination of those funds if they are non-adjacent.
- Speed – Settlement time for lightning network transactions is under a minute and can occur in milliseconds. Confirmation time on the bitcoin blockchain, for comparison, occurs every ten minutes, on average.
- Transaction throughput – There are no fundamental limits to the amount of payments per second that can occur under the protocol. The amount of transactions are only limited by the capacity and speed of each node.

=== Limitations ===
The Lightning Network (LN) operates through bidirectional payment channels between two nodes, forming smart contracts that facilitate off-chain transactions. If either party closes a channel, the final state is settled on the Bitcoin blockchain. While this design enables faster and cheaper transactions, the necessity of on-chain transactions to open and close channels introduces scalability constraints.

=== Routing ===
To preserve privacy and security, the network employs an onion routing protocol, wherein each node in the path decrypts only enough information to determine the next hop, without knowledge of the payment's origin or final destination.

As of March 2026, the Lightning Network had over 17,000 public nodes and approximately 40,000 public payment channels, with a total network capacity of around 4,900 BTC.

== Use cases ==
Bitcoin was originally intended to be a peer-to-peer electronic cash system. A notable early example occurred in May 2010 when Laszlo Hanyecz paid 10,000 BTC for two pizzas—an event now noted annually as Bitcoin Pizza Day. As Bitcoin's value and network congestion increased, this use was no longer practical.

The Lightning Network is intended to address this and to make peer-to-peer payments more practical.

Several cryptocurrency wallets offer support for the Lightning Network, including Phoenix, Cash App, Muun, Zeus, Strike and Breez.

The Lightning Network is being used in several businesses in the United States, including Steak N Shake, and some Square Terminals
