= Bitcoin =

Decentralized digital cryptocurrency

- Commonly used logo of bitcoin

Denominations
- Plural: bitcoins
- Symbol: ₿ (Unicode: U+20BF ₿ BITCOIN SIGN)
- Code: BTC
- Precision: 10^{−8}
- Subunits
- 1/1000: millibitcoin
- 1/1000000: microbitcoin
- 1/100000000: satoshi (Note: Named after Satoshi Nakamoto)

Development
- Original author: Satoshi Nakamoto
- White paper: "Bitcoin: A Peer-to-Peer Electronic Cash System"
- Implementation: Bitcoin Core
- Initial release: 0.1.0 / 9 January 2009 (17 years ago)
- Latest release: 32.1.0 / 27 October 2026 (19 days ago)
- Code repository: github.com/bitcoin/bitcoin
- Development status: Active
- Written in: C++
- Source model: Free and open-source software
- License: MIT License

Ledger
- Ledger start: 3 January 2009 (17 years ago)
- Timestamping scheme: Proof of work (partial hash inversion)
- Hash function: SHA-256 (two rounds)
- Issuance schedule: Decentralized (block reward); Initially ₿50 per block, halved every 210,000 blocks
- Block reward: ₿3.125 (as of 2026)
- Block time: 10 minutes
- Circulating supply: ₿20,057,778 (as of 12 June 2026)
- Supply limit: ₿21,000,000 (Note: The exact number is ₿20,999,999.9769.)

Valuation
- Exchange rate: Floating

Website
- Website: bitcoin.org

Bitcoin (abbreviation: BTC; sign: ₿) is the first decentralized cryptocurrency. Based on a free-market ideology, bitcoin was invented in 2008 when an unknown person published a white paper under the pseudonym of Satoshi Nakamoto. Use of bitcoin as a currency began in 2009, with the release of its open-source implementation. From 2021 to 2025, El Salvador adopted it as legal tender currency before revoking it. As bitcoin is pseudonymous, its use by criminals has attracted the attention of regulators, leading to its ban by several countries.

Bitcoin works through the collaboration of computers, each of which acts as a node in the peer-to-peer bitcoin network. Each node maintains an independent copy of a public distributed ledger of transactions, called a blockchain, without central oversight. Transactions are validated through the use of cryptography, preventing one person from spending another person's bitcoin, as long as the owner of the bitcoin keeps certain sensitive data secret.

Consensus between nodes about the content of the blockchain is achieved using a computationally intensive process based on proof of work, called mining, which is performed by purpose-built computers. Mining consumes large quantities of electricity and has been criticized for its environmental impact.

== History ==
=== Background ===
Before bitcoin, several digital cash technologies were released, starting with David Chaum's ecash in the 1980s. The idea that solutions to computational puzzles could have some value was first proposed by cryptographers Cynthia Dwork and Moni Naor in 1992. The concept was independently rediscovered by Adam Back who developed Hashcash, a proof-of-work scheme for spam control in 1997. The first proposals for distributed digital scarcity-based cryptocurrencies came from cypherpunks Wei Dai (b-money) and Nick Szabo (bit gold) in 1998. In 2004, Hal Finney developed the first currency based on reusable proof of work. These various attempts were not successful: Chaum's concept required centralized control and no banks wanted to sign on, Hashcash had no protection against double-spending, while b-money and bit gold were not resistant to Sybil attacks.

=== 2008–2009: Creation ===
External image
- Cover page of The Times 3 January 2009 showing the headline used in the genesis block

The domain name bitcoin.org was registered on 18 August 2008. On 31 October 2008, a link to a white paper authored by Satoshi Nakamoto titled Bitcoin: A Peer-to-Peer Electronic Cash System was posted to a cryptography mailing list. Nakamoto's identity remains unknown. According to computer scientist Arvind Narayanan, all individual components of bitcoin originated in earlier academic literature. Nakamoto's innovation was their complex interplay which resulted in the first decentralized, Sybil resistant, Byzantine fault tolerant digital cash system, that would eventually be referred to as the first blockchain. Nakamoto's paper was not peer-reviewed and was initially ignored by academics, who argued that it could not work.

Nakamoto released bitcoin as open-source software. On 3 January 2009, the bitcoin network was created when Nakamoto mined the starting block of the chain, known as the genesis block. Embedded in this block was the text "The Times 03/Jan/2009 Chancellor on brink of second bailout for banks", which is the date and headline of an issue of The Times newspaper. Nine days later, Hal Finney received the first bitcoin transaction: ten bitcoins from Nakamoto. Wei Dai and Nick Szabo were also early supporters. On 22 May 2010, the first known commercial transaction using bitcoin occurred when programmer Laszlo Hanyecz bought two Papa John's pizzas for ₿10,000, in what would later be celebrated as "Bitcoin Pizza Day". Satoshi tasked Finnish developer and early Bitcoin contributor Martti Malmi with creating content for the bitcoin.org website.

=== 2010–2012: Early growth ===
Blockchain analysts estimate that Nakamoto had mined about one million bitcoins before he disappeared in 2010 and handed the network alert key and control of the code repository over to Gavin Andresen. Andresen later became lead developer at the Bitcoin Foundation, an organization founded in September 2012 to promote bitcoin.

After early "proof-of-concept" transactions, the first major users of bitcoin were black markets, such as the dark web Silk Road. During its 30 months of existence, beginning in February 2011, Silk Road exclusively accepted bitcoins as payment, transacting ₿9.9 million, worth about $214 million.

=== 2013–2014: First regulatory actions ===
In March 2013, the US Financial Crimes Enforcement Network (FinCEN) established regulatory guidelines for "decentralized virtual currencies" such as bitcoin, classifying American bitcoin miners who sell their generated bitcoins as money services businesses, subject to registration and other legal obligations. In May 2013, US authorities seized the unregistered exchange Mt. Gox. In June 2013, the US Drug Enforcement Administration seized ₿11.02 from an individual attempting to use them to purchase illicit drugs. This marked the first time a government agency had seized bitcoins. The FBI seized about ₿30,000 in October 2013 from Silk Road, following the arrest of its founder Ross Ulbricht.

In December 2013, the People's Bank of China prohibited Chinese financial institutions from using bitcoin. After the announcement, the value of bitcoin dropped, and Baidu no longer accepted bitcoins for certain services. Buying real-world goods with any virtual currency had been illegal in China since at least 2009.

=== 2015–2019 ===
Research produced by the University of Cambridge estimated that in 2017, there were 2.9 to 5.8 million unique users using a cryptocurrency wallet, most of them using bitcoin. In August 2017, the SegWit software upgrade was activated. Segwit was intended to support the Lightning Network as well as improve scalability. SegWit opponents, who supported larger blocks as a scalability solution, forked to create Bitcoin Cash, one of many forks of bitcoin.

In December 2017, the first futures on bitcoin was introduced by the Chicago Mercantile Exchange (CME).

In February 2018, the price crashed after China imposed a complete ban on bitcoin trading. The percentage of bitcoin trading in the Chinese renminbi fell from over 90% in September 2017 to less than 1% in June 2018. During the same year, bitcoin prices were negatively affected by several hacks or thefts from cryptocurrency exchanges.

=== 2020–present ===
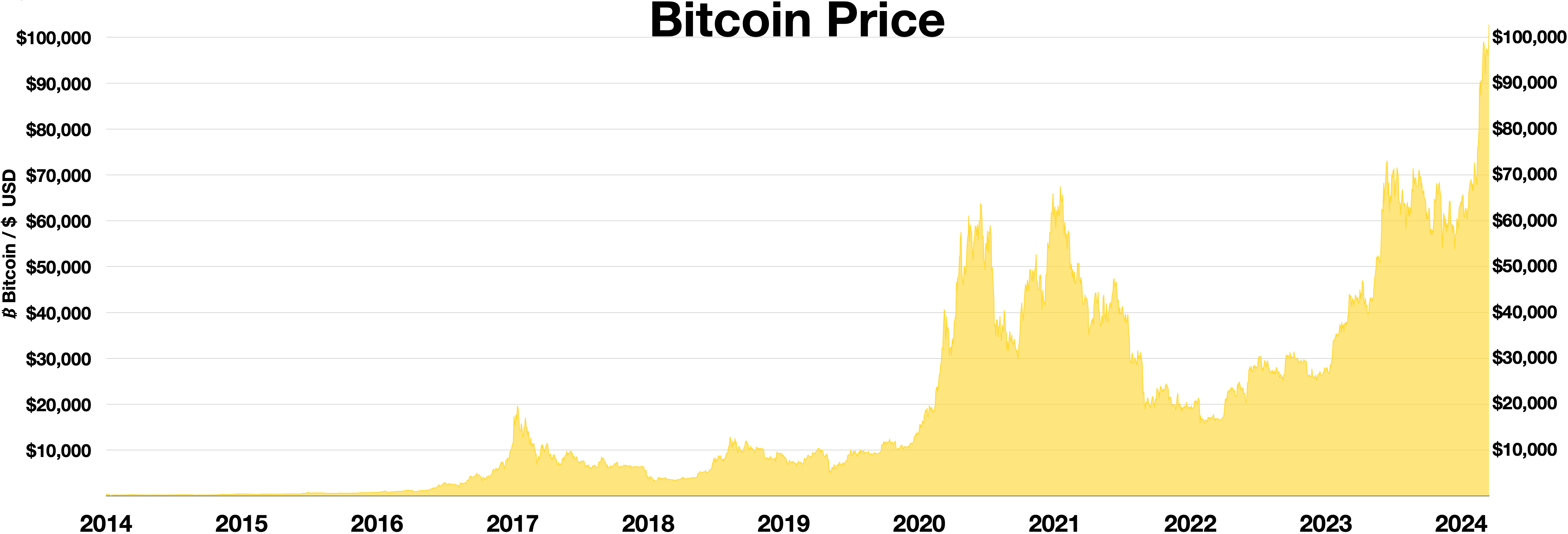
Bitcoin price 1 December 2014 – 4 December 2024

In 2020, some major companies and institutions started to acquire bitcoin: MicroStrategy invested $250 million in bitcoin as a treasury reserve asset, Square, Inc., $50 million, and MassMutual, $100 million. In November 2020, PayPal added support for bitcoin in the US.

In February 2021, bitcoin's market capitalization reached $1 trillion for the first time. In November 2021, the Taproot soft-fork upgrade was activated, adding support for Schnorr signatures, improved functionality of smart contracts and Lightning Network. Before, bitcoin only used a custom elliptic curve with the ECDSA algorithm to produce signatures. In September 2021, bitcoin became legal tender currency in El Salvador, alongside the US dollar. In October 2021, the first bitcoin futures exchange-traded fund (ETF), called BITO, from ProShares was approved by the SEC and listed on the CME.

In early 2022, during the Canadian trucker protests opposing COVID-19 vaccine mandates, organizers turned to bitcoin to receive donations after traditional financial platforms restricted access to funding. Proponents highlighted bitcoin's use as a tool for fundraising in situations where access to conventional financial systems may be restricted. In May and June 2022, the bitcoin price fell following the collapses of TerraUSD, a stablecoin, and the Celsius Network, a cryptocurrency loan company.

In 2023, ordinals—non-fungible tokens (NFTs)—on bitcoin, went live. As of June 2023, River Financial estimated that bitcoin had 81.7 million users, about 1% of the global population.

In January 2024, the first 11 US spot bitcoin ETFs began trading, offering direct exposure to bitcoin for the first time on American stock exchanges. In December 2024, bitcoin price reached $100,000 for the first time, as US president-elect Donald Trump promised to make the US the "crypto capital of the planet" and to stockpile bitcoin. The same month, BlackRock, the world's largest asset manager, recommended investors to allocate up to 2% of their portfolio to bitcoin.

As of 2025, the Salvadoran government continues to describe Bitcoin as legal tender under the 2021 Bitcoin Law; however, a January 2025 reform removed obligations for businesses and the government to accept it, so many analysts regard its legal-tender status as effectively ended in practice. In March 2025, President Trump signed an executive order to establish a strategic bitcoin reserve. Later that year, some U.S. states, such as Texas and New Hampshire also instituted strategic bitcoin reserves, and the Czech National Bank bought less than €1 million in a "test portfolio".

== Design ==
=== Units and divisibility ===
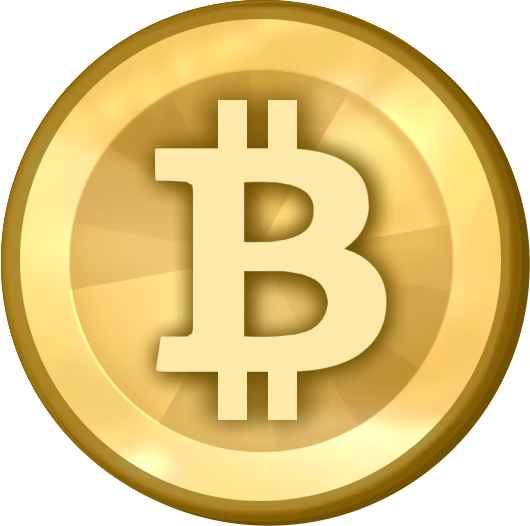
Bitcoin logos made by Satoshi Nakamoto in 2009 (left) and 2010 (right).

The unit of account of the bitcoin system is the bitcoin. It is most commonly represented with the symbol ₿ designed in 2010 and the currency code BTC. However, the BTC code does not conform to ISO 4217 as BT is the country code of Bhutan, and ISO 4217 requires the first letter used in global commodities to be 'X'. XBT, a code that conforms to ISO 4217 though not officially part of it, is used by Bloomberg L.P.

No uniform capitalization convention exists; some sources use Bitcoin, capitalized, to refer to the technology and network, and bitcoin, lowercase, for the unit of account. The Cambridge Advanced Learner's Dictionary and the Oxford Advanced Learner's Dictionary use the capitalized and lowercase variants without distinction.

One bitcoin is divisible to eight decimal places. Units for smaller amounts of bitcoin are the millibitcoin (mBTC), equal to 1/1000 bitcoin, and the satoshi (sat), representing 1/100000000 (one hundred millionth) bitcoin, the smallest amount possible. 100,000 satoshis are one mBTC.

=== Blockchain ===
As a decentralized system, bitcoin operates without a central authority or single administrator, so that anyone can create a new bitcoin address and transact without needing any approval. This is accomplished through a specialized distributed ledger called a blockchain that records bitcoin transactions.

The blockchain is implemented as an ordered list of blocks. Each block contains the hash of the previous block, made by hashing its header twice with SHA-256, chaining them in chronological order. The blockchain is maintained by a peer-to-peer network. Individual blocks, public addresses, and transactions within blocks are public information, and can be examined using a blockchain explorer.

Nodes validate and broadcast transactions. Each node maintains a copy of the blockchain for ownership verification. A new block is created every 10 minutes on average, updating the blockchain across all nodes without central oversight. This process tracks bitcoin spending, ensuring each bitcoin is spent only once. Unlike a traditional ledger that tracks physical currency, bitcoins exist digitally as unspent outputs of transactions.

=== Addresses and transactions ===
Simplified chain of ownership. In practice, a transaction can have more than one input and more than one output.

In the blockchain, bitcoins are linked to specific strings called addresses. Most often, an address encodes a hash of a single public key. Creating such an address involves generating a random private key and then computing the corresponding address. This process is almost instant, but the reverse (finding the private key for a given address) is nearly impossible. Publishing such a bitcoin address does not risk its private key, and it is extremely unlikely to accidentally generate a used key with funds. To use bitcoins, owners need their private key to digitally sign transactions, which are verified by the network using the public key, keeping the private key secret. An address may encode the hash of a bitcoin script that specifies more complex requirements to spend the funds. One common example is "multisig", in which multiple distinct private keys must mutually sign any transaction that attempts to spend the funds.

Bitcoin transactions use a Forth-like scripting language, involving one or more inputs and outputs. When sending bitcoins, a user specifies the recipients' addresses and the amount for each output. This allows sending bitcoins to several recipients in a single transaction. To prevent double-spending, each input must refer to a previous unspent output in the blockchain. Using multiple inputs is similar to using multiple coins in a cash transaction. As in a cash transaction, the sum of inputs can exceed the intended sum of payments. In such a case, an additional output can return the change back to the payer. Unallocated input satoshis in the transaction become the transaction fee.

Losing a private key means losing access to the bitcoins, with no other proof of ownership accepted by the protocol. For instance, in 2013, a user lost ₿7,500, valued at US$7.5 million, by accidentally discarding a hard drive with the private key. It is estimated that around 20% of all bitcoins are lost. The private key must also be kept secret as its exposure, such as through a data breach, can lead to theft of the associated bitcoins. As of December 2017, approximately ₿980,000 had been stolen from cryptocurrency exchanges.

=== Mining ===
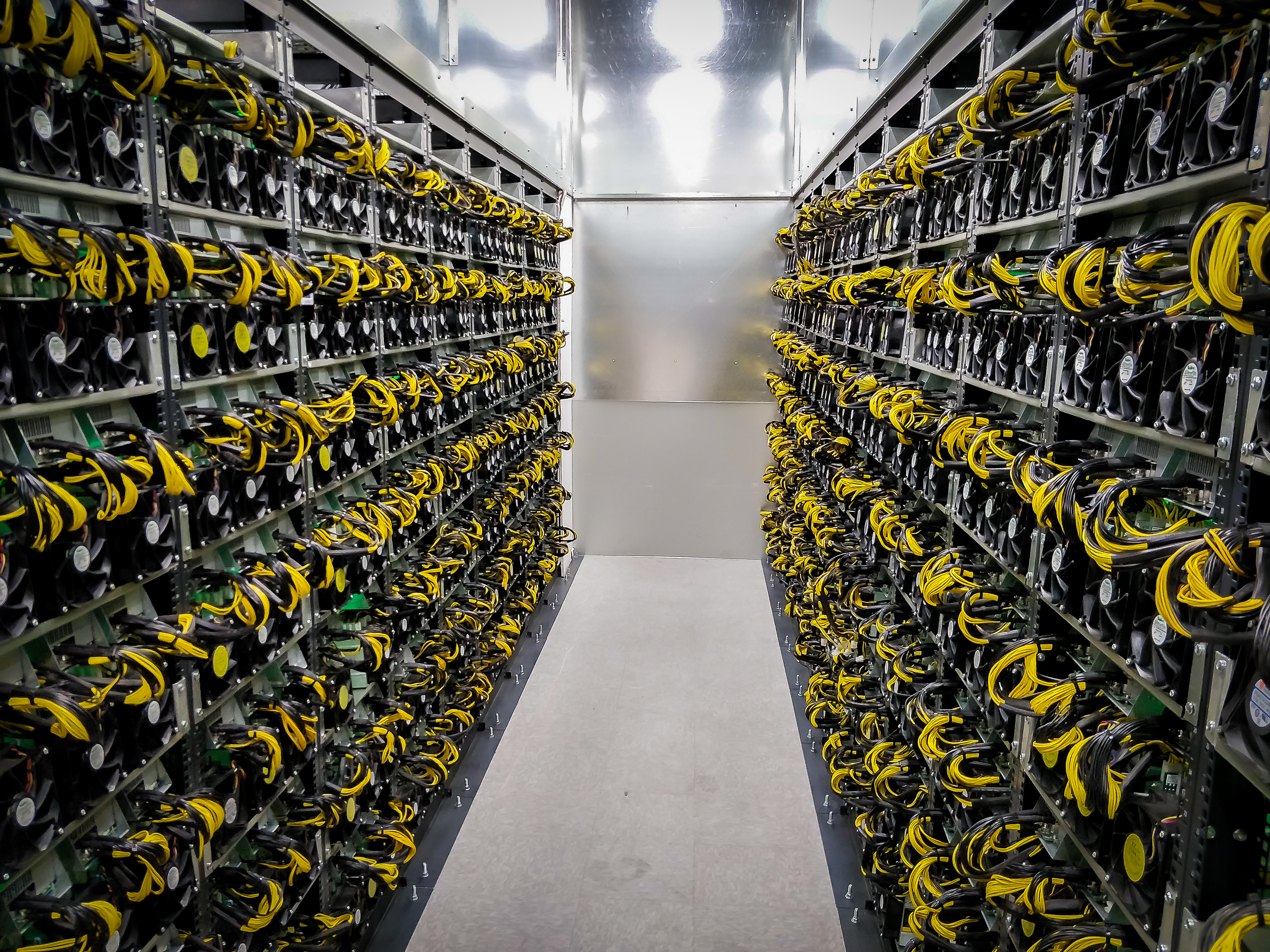
Bitcoin mining facility with large amounts of mining hardware

Miners don't directly act as nodes, but do communicate with nodes. The mining process is primarily intended to prevent double-spending and get all nodes to agree on the content of the blockchain, but it also has desirable side-effects such as making it infeasible for adversaries to stifle valid transactions or alter the historical record of transactions, since doing so generally requires the adversary to have access to more mining power than the rest of the network combined.

The mining process in bitcoin involves maintaining the blockchain through computer processing power. Miners group and broadcast new transactions into blocks, which are then verified by the network. Each block must contain a proof of work (PoW) to be accepted, involving finding a nonce number that, combined with the block content, produces a hash numerically smaller than the network's difficulty target. This PoW is simple to verify but hard to generate, requiring many attempts. PoW forms the basis of bitcoin's consensus mechanism.

The difficulty of generating a block is deterministically adjusted based on the mining power on the network by changing the difficulty target, which is recalibrated every 2,016 blocks (approximately two weeks) to maintain an average time of ten minutes between new blocks. The process requires significant computational power and specialized hardware.

Miners who successfully create a new block with a valid nonce can collect transaction fees from the included transactions and a fixed reward in bitcoins. To claim this reward, a special transaction called a coinbase is included in the block, with the miner as the payee. All bitcoins in existence have been created through this type of transaction. This reward is halved every 210,000 blocks until ₿21 million have been issued in total, which is expected to occur around the year 2140. Afterward, miners will only earn from transaction fees. These fees are determined by the transaction's size and the amount of data stored, measured in satoshis per byte.

The proof of work system and the chaining of blocks make blockchain modifications very difficult, as altering one block requires changing all subsequent blocks. As more blocks are added, modifying older blocks becomes increasingly challenging. In case of disagreement, nodes trust the longest chain, which required the greatest amount of effort to produce. To tamper or censor the ledger, one needs to control the majority of the global hashrate. The high cost required to reach this level of computational power secures the bitcoin blockchain.

The environmental impact of bitcoin mining is controversial and has attracted the attention of regulators, leading to restrictions or incentives in various jurisdictions. As of 2025, a non-peer-reviewed study by the Cambridge Centre for Alternative Finance (CCAF) estimated that bitcoin mining represented 0.5% of global electricity consumption and 0.08% of world greenhouse gas emissions, comparable to Slovakia's emissions. About half of the electricity used is generated through fossil fuels. Moreover, mining hardware's short lifespan results in electronic waste. In October 2025, the US was the largest mining country with 38% of the global bitcoin mining market share, followed by Russia (16%) and China (14%, despite all cryptocurrency trading and mining being banned there in 2021).

=== Privacy and fungibility ===
Bitcoin is pseudonymous, with funds linked to addresses, not real-world identities. While the owners of these addresses are not directly identified, all transactions are public on the blockchain. Patterns of use, like spending coins from multiple inputs, can hint at a common owner. Public data can sometimes be matched with known address owners. Bitcoin exchanges might also need to collect personal data as per legal requirements. For enhanced privacy, users can generate a new address for each transaction.

In the bitcoin network, each bitcoin is treated equally, ensuring basic fungibility. However, users and applications can choose to differentiate between bitcoins. While wallets and software treat all bitcoins the same, each bitcoin's transaction history is recorded on the blockchain. This public record allows for chain analysis, where users can identify and potentially reject bitcoins from controversial sources. For example, in 2012, Mt. Gox froze accounts containing bitcoins identified as stolen.

=== Wallets ===
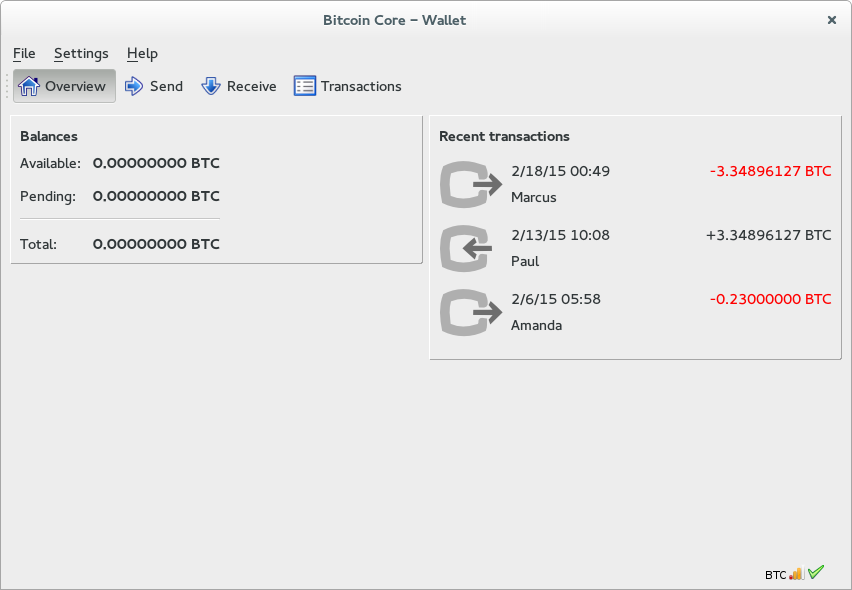
Screenshot of Bitcoin Core

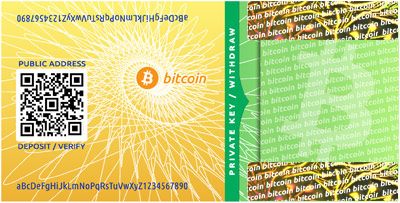
A paper wallet with the address as a QR code while the private key is hidden

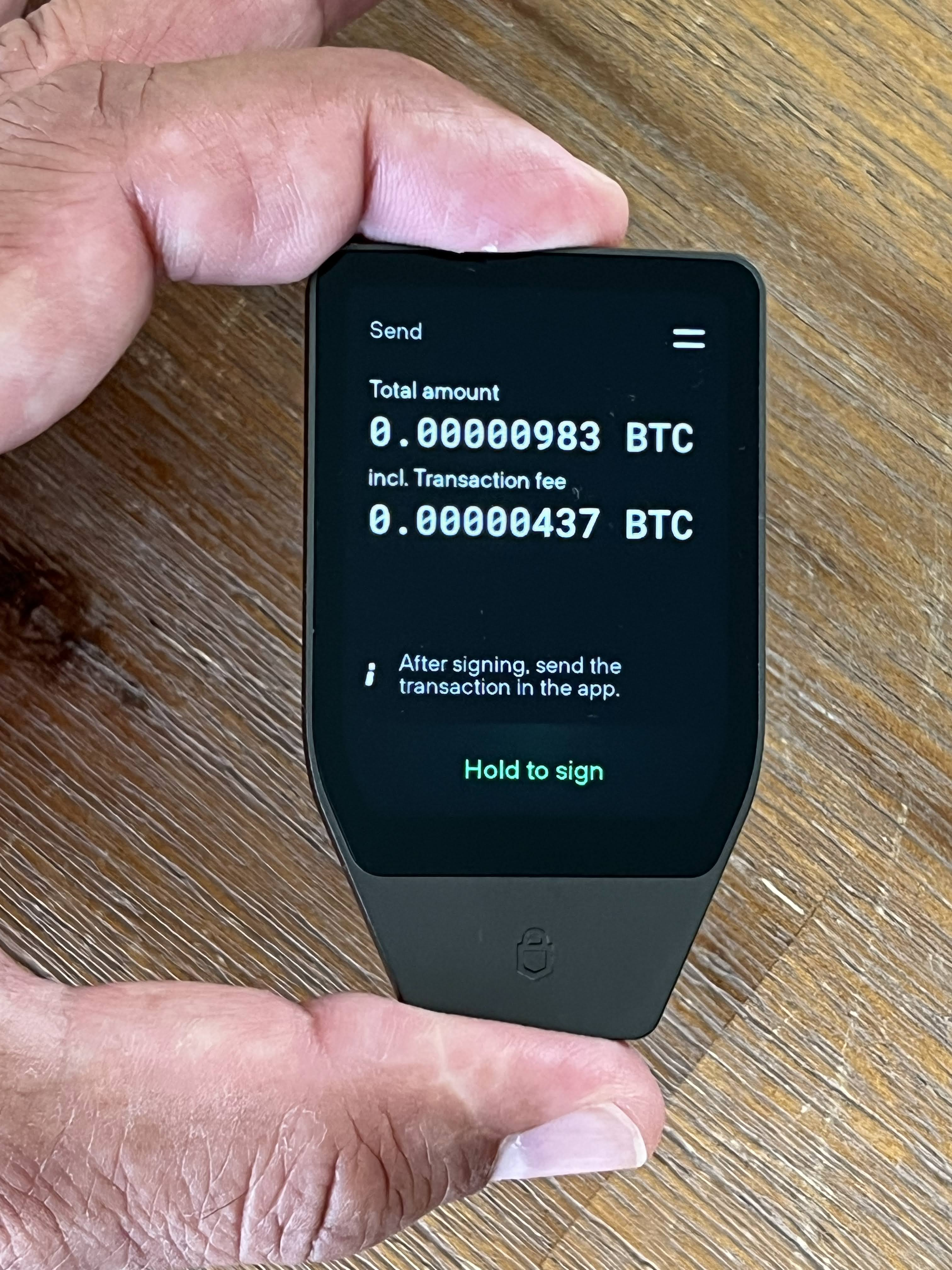
A hardware wallet which processes bitcoin transactions without exposing private keys

Bitcoin wallets were the first cryptocurrency wallets, enabling users to store the information necessary to transact bitcoins. The first wallet program, simply named Bitcoin, and sometimes referred to as the Satoshi client, was released in 2009 by Nakamoto as open-source software. Bitcoin Core is among the best known clients. Forks of Bitcoin Core exist such as Bitcoin Unlimited. Wallets can be full clients, with a full copy of the blockchain to check the validity of mined blocks, or lightweight clients, just to send and receive transactions without a local copy of the entire blockchain. Third-party internet services, called online wallets or hot wallets, store users' credentials on their servers, making them susceptible of hacks. Cold storage protects bitcoins from such hacks by keeping private keys offline, either through specialized hardware wallets or paper printouts.

=== Scalability and decentralization challenges ===
Nakamoto limited the block size to one megabyte. The limited block size and frequency can lead to delayed processing of transactions, increased fees and a bitcoin scalability problem. The Lightning Network, a second-layer routing network, is a potential scaling solution.

Research shows a trend towards centralization in bitcoin as miners join pools for stable income. If a single miner or pool controls more than 50% of the hashing power, it would allow them to censor transactions and double-spend coins. In 2014, mining pool Ghash.io reached 51% mining power, causing safety concerns, but later voluntarily capped its power at 39.99% for the benefit of the whole network. A few entities also dominate other parts of the ecosystem such as the client software, online wallets, and simplified payment verification (SPV) clients.

== Economics and usage ==
=== Bitcoin's theoretical roots and ideology ===
According to the European Central Bank, the decentralization of money offered by bitcoin has its theoretical roots in the Austrian school of economics, especially with Friedrich Hayek's The Denationalisation of Money, in which he advocates a complete free market in the production, distribution and management of money to end the monopoly of central banks. Sociologist Nigel Dodd argues that the essence of the bitcoin ideology is to remove money from social, as well as governmental, control. The Economist describes bitcoin as "a techno-anarchist project to create an online version of cash, a way for people to transact without the possibility of interference from malicious governments or banks". These philosophical ideas initially attracted libertarians and anarchists.

=== Recognition as a currency and legal status ===
Legal status of bitcoin Permissive (legal to use bitcoin, with minimal or no restrictions) Restricted (some legal restrictions on the usage of bitcoin) Contentious (interpretation of old laws, but bitcoin is not directly prohibited) Prohibited (full or partial prohibition on the use of bitcoin) No data (no information available)

Money serves three purposes: a store of value, a medium of exchange, and a unit of account. According to The Economist in 2014, bitcoin functions best as a medium of exchange. In 2015, The Economist noted that bitcoins had three qualities useful in a currency: they are "hard to earn, limited in supply and easy to verify". However, a 2018 assessment by The Economist stated that cryptocurrencies met none of these three criteria. Per some researchers, as of 2015, bitcoin functions more as a payment system than as a currency. In 2014, economist Robert J. Shiller wrote that bitcoin has potential as a unit of account for measuring the relative value of goods, as with Chile's Unidad de Fomento, but that "Bitcoin in its present form... doesn't really solve any sensible economic problem". In 2017, François Velde, senior economist at the Chicago Fed, described bitcoin as "unlikely by itself to replace monies in well-functioning monetary systems."

The legal status of bitcoin varies substantially from one jurisdiction to another. Because of its decentralized nature and its global presence, regulating bitcoin is difficult. However, the use of bitcoin can be criminalized, and shutting down exchanges and the peer-to-peer economy in a given country would constitute a de facto ban. The use of bitcoin by criminals has attracted the attention of financial regulators, legislative bodies, and law enforcement. Nobel-prize winning economist Joseph Stiglitz says that bitcoin's anonymity encourages money laundering and other crimes. This is the main justification behind bitcoin bans. As of November 2021, nine countries applied an absolute ban (Algeria, Bangladesh, China, Egypt, Iraq, Morocco, Nepal, Qatar, and Tunisia) while another 42 countries had an implicit ban.

=== Use for payments ===
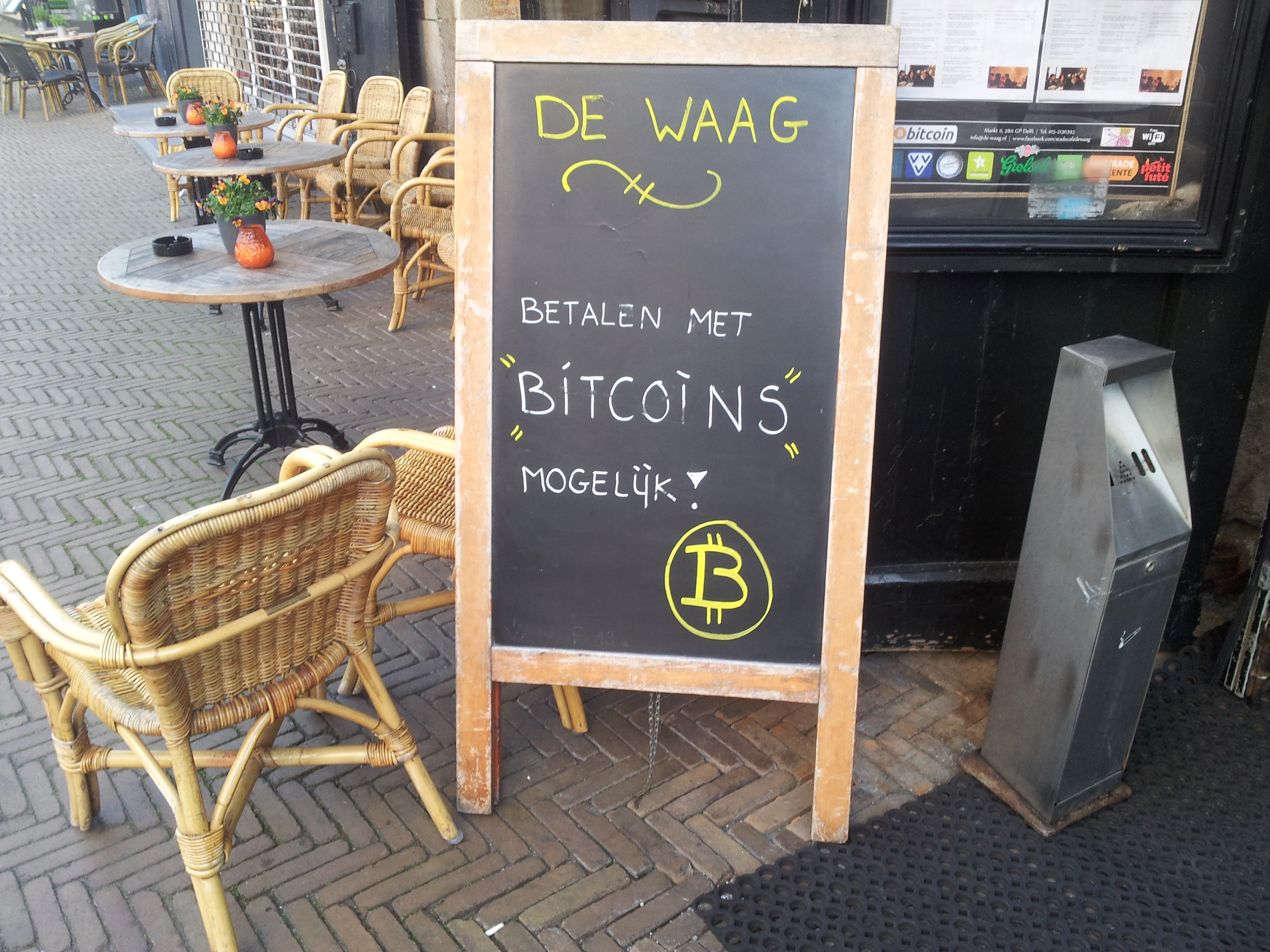
Café in Delft accepting Bitcoin

According to Harvard Professor Kenneth Rogoff as of 2025, bitcoin is rarely used in regular transactions with merchants, but is popular in the informal economy and for criminal activities. Prices are not usually quoted in bitcoin and trades involve conversions into fiat currencies. Commonly cited reasons for not using bitcoin include high costs, the inability to process chargebacks, high price volatility, long transaction times, and transaction fees (especially for small purchases). Bloomberg reported that bitcoin was being used for large-item purchases on the site Overstock.com and for cross-border payments to freelancers. As of 2015, there was little sign of bitcoin use in international remittances despite high fees charged by banks and Western Union.

From September 2021 until January 2025, the Bitcoin Law made bitcoin a legal tender currency in El Salvador, alongside the US dollar. The adoption had been criticized internationally and within El Salvador. In 2022, the International Monetary Fund (IMF) urged El Salvador to reverse its decision. As of 2022, the use of Bitcoin in El Salvador remained low: 80% of businesses refused to accept it. In 2025, El Salvador's government revoked bitcoin's status as legal tender currency to comply with conditions set by the IMF for a loan. El Salvador still describes bitcoin as "legal tender", but its acceptance is no longer obligitory (as it is with the US dollar) and the El Salvador government no longer accepts bitcoin for payment of taxes or fees.

In April 2022, the Central African Republic (CAR) adopted bitcoin as legal tender alongside the CFA franc, but repealed the reform one year later.

Bitcoin is also used by some governments. For instance, the Iranian government initially opposed cryptocurrencies, but later began using them to circumvent sanctions. Since 2020, Iran has required local bitcoin miners to sell bitcoin to the Central Bank of Iran, allowing the central bank to use it for imports. Some constituent states and local governments also accept tax payments in bitcoin, including Colorado in the US and Zug and Lugano in Switzerland. As of 2023, the US government owned more than $5 billion worth of seized bitcoin.

=== Use for investment and status as an economic bubble ===
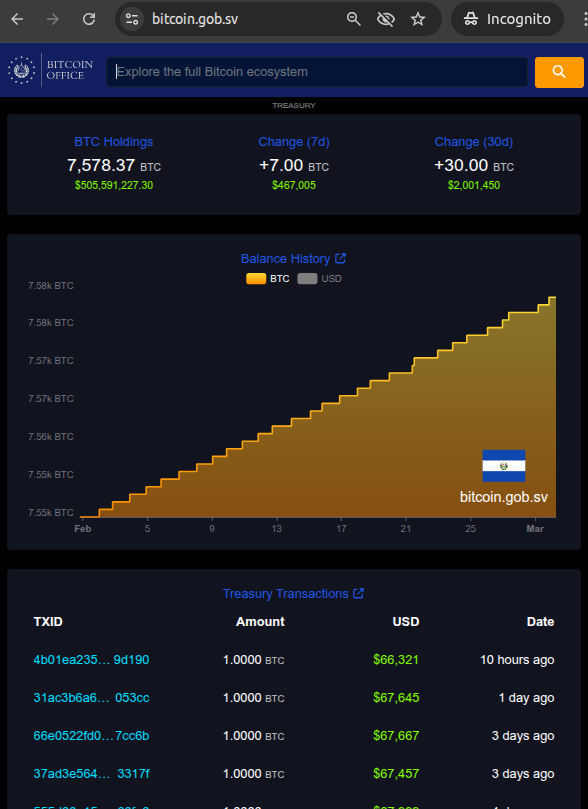
Government website with El Salvador reserves

As of 2018, the overwhelming majority of bitcoin transactions took place on cryptocurrency exchanges. Since 2014, regulated bitcoin funds also allow exposure to the asset or to futures as an investment. Bitcoin is used as a store of value: individuals and companies such as the Winklevoss twins and Elon Musk's companies SpaceX and Tesla have each bought and sold hundreds of millions of dollars worth of bitcoin. Bitcoin wealth is highly concentrated, with 0.01% holding 27% of in-circulation currency, as of 2021.

As of March 2025, El Salvador had $550 million worth of bitcoin in its international reserves, about 6,102 coins.

Bitcoin, along with other cryptocurrencies, has been described as an economic bubble by several economists, including Nobel Prize in Economics laureates, such as Joseph Stiglitz, James Heckman, and Paul Krugman. Another recipient of the prize, Robert Shiller, argues that bitcoin is rather a fad that may become an asset class. He describes its price growth as an "epidemic", driven by contagious narratives. In 2024, Jean Tirole, also Nobel laureate, described bitcoin as a "pure bubble" as its intrinsic value is zero. According to him, some bubbles are long-lasting such as gold and fiat currencies, and it is impossible to predict whether bitcoin would implode like other financial bubbles or become an alternative to gold. The same year, Federal Reserve Chair Jerome Powell described bitcoin as a digital competitor to gold but not to the dollar as he argued it is a highly volatile speculative asset not used as a form of payment. In 2025, Kenneth Rogoff claimed that Krugman was wrong and that Bitcoin had value as it is competing with the dollar to become the means of exchange of the underground economy which represents 20% of the world's GDP. According to Rogoff, bitcoin is "the ideal currency for a more fragmented and uncertain global landscape" and it could become appealing to emerging-market central banks as a "politically neutral" reserve currency. In 2025, the nominee for the Chair of the Federal Reserve, Kevin Warsh, described Bitcoin as the "new gold."

According to research published in the International Review of Financial Analysis in 2018, bitcoin as an asset is highly volatile and does not behave like any other conventional asset. According to one 2022 analysis published in The Journal of Alternative Investments, bitcoin was less volatile than oil, silver, US Treasuries, and 190 stocks in the S&P 500 during and after the 2020 stock market crash. The term hodl was created in December 2013 for holding bitcoin rather than selling it during periods of volatility.

In 2014, economist Nouriel Roubini described bitcoin as a Ponzi scheme. Legal scholar Eric Posner disagrees, however, as "a real Ponzi scheme takes fraud; bitcoin, by contrast, seems more like a collective delusion". A 2014 World Bank report also concluded that bitcoin was not a deliberate Ponzi scheme.

=== Market characteristics ===
Bitcoin markets are always active, contrasting with traditional financial markets that may adhere to fixed trading hours. Bitcoin prices show much higher volatility and respond strongly to both regulatory changes and market events.

The volume of bitcoin trading can fluctuate considerably among various exchanges and geographic regions. The daily transaction volume of bitcoin across all exchanges typically reaches $50 billion as of 2025.

== See also ==
- Alternative currency – Medium of exchange complementing national currencies
- List of cryptocurrencies
