= Marlin (disambiguation) =

The marlin is a large billfish sometimes also known as the spearfish.

Marlin may also refer to:

== Places ==
- Marlín, Castile-Leon, a village in Spain
- Marlin, Texas, city in Falls County, Texas, United States
- Marlin, Washington, a town in Grant County, Washington, United States

== Sports ==
- Cincinnati Marlins, a swim team based in Cincinnati, Ohio
- Miami Marlins, a Major League Baseball team based in Miami, Florida

== Technology ==
- MarLIN, Marine Life Information Network
- Marlin (DRM), a Digital Rights Management technology
- Marlin (firmware), for RepRap based 3D printers, forked from the Sprinter firmware
- Marlin, code name for Linspire Five-0, a Linux distribution
- Marlin, code name for the Google Pixel XL

== Vehicles ==
- Marlin (car), a British sports car maker
- Marlin (dinghy), a small 2–3 crew sailing dinghy designed by Ian Proctor
- P5M Marlin, a Cold War patrol bomber of the US Navy
- Rambler Marlin, an American automobile of the 1960s
- SS Marlin, a Liberian steamship in service 1963–65
- USS Marlin, two ships of the United States Navy
- TCB Marlin USCV, Turkish unmanned combat surface vessel

== Other uses ==
- Marlin (magazine), an American magazine devoted to big game fishing
- Marlin (name)
- Marlin Firearms, a manufacturer of rifles and shotguns
  - .444 Marlin
  - .450 Marlin
  - Marlin Model 336
- Marlin Records, a record label
- Marlin (Finding Nemo), a clownfish character in the 2003 animated film Finding Nemo

== See also ==
- Marlon (disambiguation)
- Marling (disambiguation)
