= Marling =

Marling may refer to:

== Places ==
- Marling, South Tyrol, Italy
- Marling, Missouri, United States

== Other uses ==
- Marling (surname)
- Marling baronets
- Marling (horse), a Thoroughbred racehorse
- Marling School, a grammar school in Stroud, Gloucestershire, England
- Marlinspike, a tool used in marine ropework
- Spreading marl on land

== See also ==
- Marlin (disambiguation)
