= Marlin (name) =

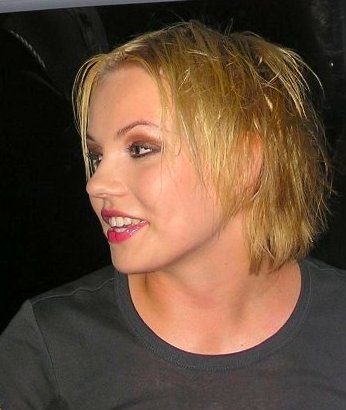
Lene Marlin 2005

Marlin may refer to the following people:

== Given name ==
=== Male ===
- Marlin Barnes (1974–1996), American linebacker
- Marlin Briscoe (1945–2022), American professional football wide receiver
- Marlin Carter (1912–1993), American baseball player
- Marlin Cannon (born 1970), American sprinter
- Marlin Chinn (born 1970), American basketball coach
- Marlin Darrah, American director
- Marlin Eller, American programmer
- Marlin Fitzwater (born 1942), White House Press Secretary under presidents Ronald Reagan and George H. W. Bush
- Marlin Hurt (1905–1946), American stage entertainer and radio actor
- Marlin Ikenberry (born 1973), American baseball coach
- Marlin Jackson (born 1983), American football defensive back
- Marlin K. Jensen (born 1942), American Mormon missionary
- Marlin Klein (born 2002), German-American football player
- Marlin Kuykendall, American former mayor of Prescott, Arizona
- Marlin Lane (born 1991), American football running back
- Marlin Maddoux (1933–2004), American radio broadcaster
- Marlin McKeever (1940–2006), American football player
- Marlin Edgar Olmsted (1847–1913), American representative
- Marlin Perkins (1905–1986), American zoologist and TV personality
- Marlin T. Phelps (1881–1964), American justice
- Marlin Piana (born 1982), Congolese footballer
- Marlin Schmidt (born 1978), Canadian politician
- Marlin Schneider (born 1942), Democratic Party member of the Wisconsin State Assembly
- Marlin Skiles (1906–1981), American composer
- Marlin Stuart (1918–1994), American Major League Baseball relief pitcher
- Marlin Stutzman (born 1976), American politician

=== Female ===
- Marlin Maldonado (born 1985), Guatemalan badminton player

== Surname ==
- Alice Tepper Marlin (born 1944), President and CEO of Social Accountability International
- Bob Marlin (born 1959), American basketball coach
- Brigid Marlin (born 1936), American artist
- Calvin Marlin (born 1976), South African football player
- Coo Coo Marlin (1932–2005), American NASCAR driver; father of Sterling Marlin
- Davey Marlin-Jones (1932–2004), American stage director and television personality
- Franck Marlin (born 1964), member of the National Assembly of France
- Jean Marlin (1833–1872), a sergeant of the French 8th Battalion of infantry
- John Marlin (disambiguation), several people
- Lene Marlin (born 1980), Norwegian musician
- Leona Marlin-Romeo (born 1973), 5th Prime Minister of Sint Maarten
- Mike Marlin (born 1961), British singer-songwriter
- Olga Marlin (1934–2025), American-born educator and author based in Kenya
- Randal Marlin (born 1938), Canadian professor of philosophy
- Renee Marlin-Bennett (born 1959), American political scientist
- Steadman Marlin (born 1980), American NASCAR driver, son of Sterling
- Sterling Marlin (born 1957), American NASCAR driver
- William Marlin (born 1950), 3rd Prime Minister of Sint Maarten

== See also ==
- Marlon
- Marlene (given name)
