= Barbarians Led by Bill Gates =

1998 book by Jennifer Edstrom and Marlin Eller

Barbarians Led by Bill Gates: Microsoft from the Inside
- Author: Marlin Eller, Jennifer Edstrom
- Language: English
- Subject: Computer Software Industry, Microsoft Corporation
- Publisher: Henry Holt
- Publication date: 1998
- Publication place: United States
- Pages: 256
- ISBN: 0-8050-5754-4
- OCLC: 38527822
- Dewey Decimal: 338.7/610053/0973 21
- LC Class: HD9696.63.U64 M534 1998

Barbarians Led by Bill Gates: Microsoft from the Inside is a book that was jointly written by Jennifer Edstrom and Marlin Eller, an American programmer who was a manager and a software developer at Microsoft Corporation from 1982 to 1995, and development lead for the Graphics Device Interface (GDI) of Windows 1.0 and also for Pen Windows. Written as a third-person account of Eller's experiences at Microsoft, it goes into detail about the early years of Microsoft and its emergence as a massive corporation.

Two chapters of the book deal specifically with the business contacts between Microsoft and GO Corporation. In April 2008, as part of a larger federal court case, the gesture features of the Windows/Tablet PC operating system and hardware were found to infringe on a patent by GO Corp. concerning gesture interfaces in operating systems for portable computers.
