= Chrysler Crossfire =

Two-seat sports car produced by Mercedes-Benz and marketed by Chrysler

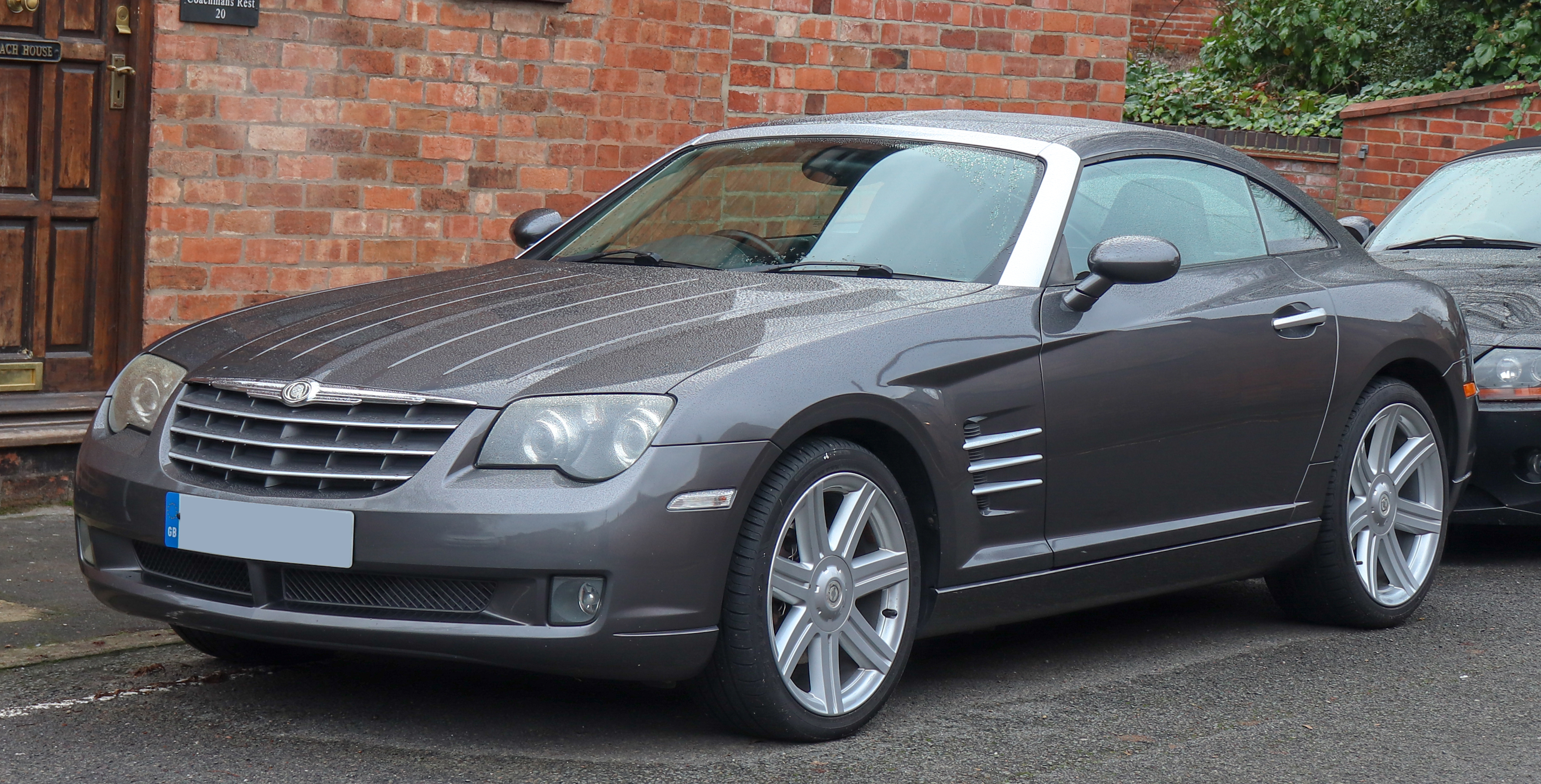
- 2004 Chrysler Crossfire coupe

Overview
- Manufacturer: DaimlerChrysler
- Production: February 2003 – December 2007 (76,014 units)
- Model years: 2004–2008
- Assembly: Germany: Osnabrück (Karmann)
- Designer: Eric Stoddard; Andrew Dyson

Body and chassis
- Class: Sports car
- Body style: 2-door convertible; 2-door fastback coupe
- Layout: Front-engine, rear-wheel-drive
- Platform: Chrysler ZH; Mercedes-Benz R170
- Related: Mercedes-Benz SLK-Class (R170)

Powertrain
- Engine: 3.2 L Mercedes-Benz M112 E32 (195 cu in) V6; 3.2 L Mercedes-Benz M112 E32 ML Kompressor (195 cu in) s/c V6
- Transmission: 5-speed Mercedes-Benz 5G-Tronic automatic (SRT-6); 6-speed NSG370 manual

Dimensions
- Wheelbase: 94.5 in (2,400 mm)
- Length: 159.8 in (4,059 mm)
- Width: 69.5 in (1,765 mm)
- Height: 51.5 in (1,308 mm) (coupe); 51.8 in (1,316 mm) (roadster)

Chronology
- Predecessor: Plymouth/Chrysler Prowler; Chrysler TC by Maserati

The Chrysler Crossfire is a rear-wheel drive, two-seat sports car, marketed by Chrysler and manufactured in Germany by Karmann across the 2004 to 2008 model years.

Developed during the period Chrysler and Daimler-Benz were merged, known as DaimlerChrysler, the two-seater uses the Mercedes-Benz R170 platform and shares 80% of its components with the first generation SLK.

Beginning in 2001 as a concept car styled by Eric Stoddard, the Crossfire was further refined by Andrew Dyson before production started in 2003 for the 2004 model year sales.

== Design ==
The name "Crossfire" refers to two character lines that run from front to rear along the body sides, prominently crossing below the mirrors on the door panels. Conceived during the period of Daimler Chrysler, the name also refers to the collaboration of the two companies.

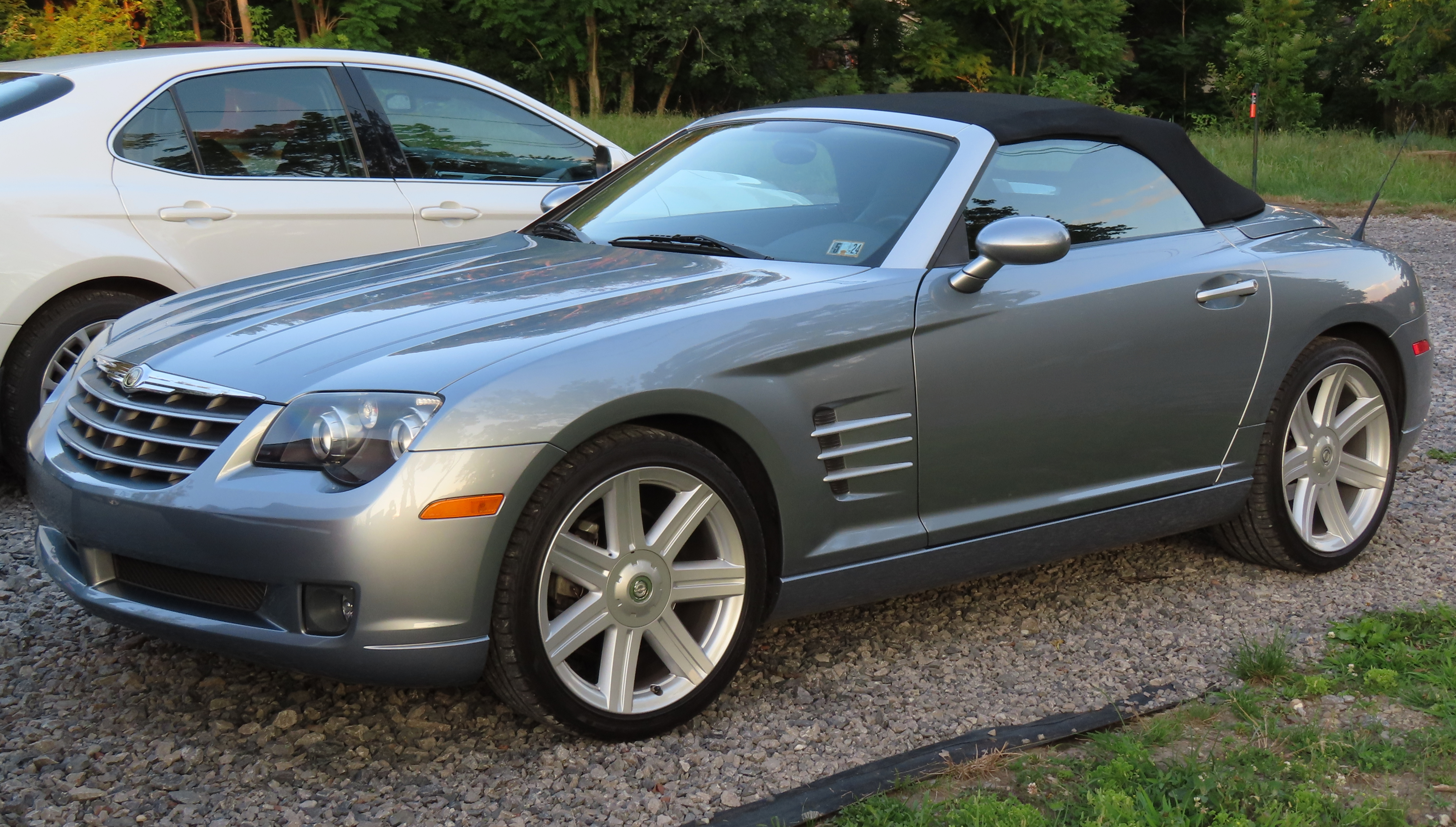
Crossfire Roadster

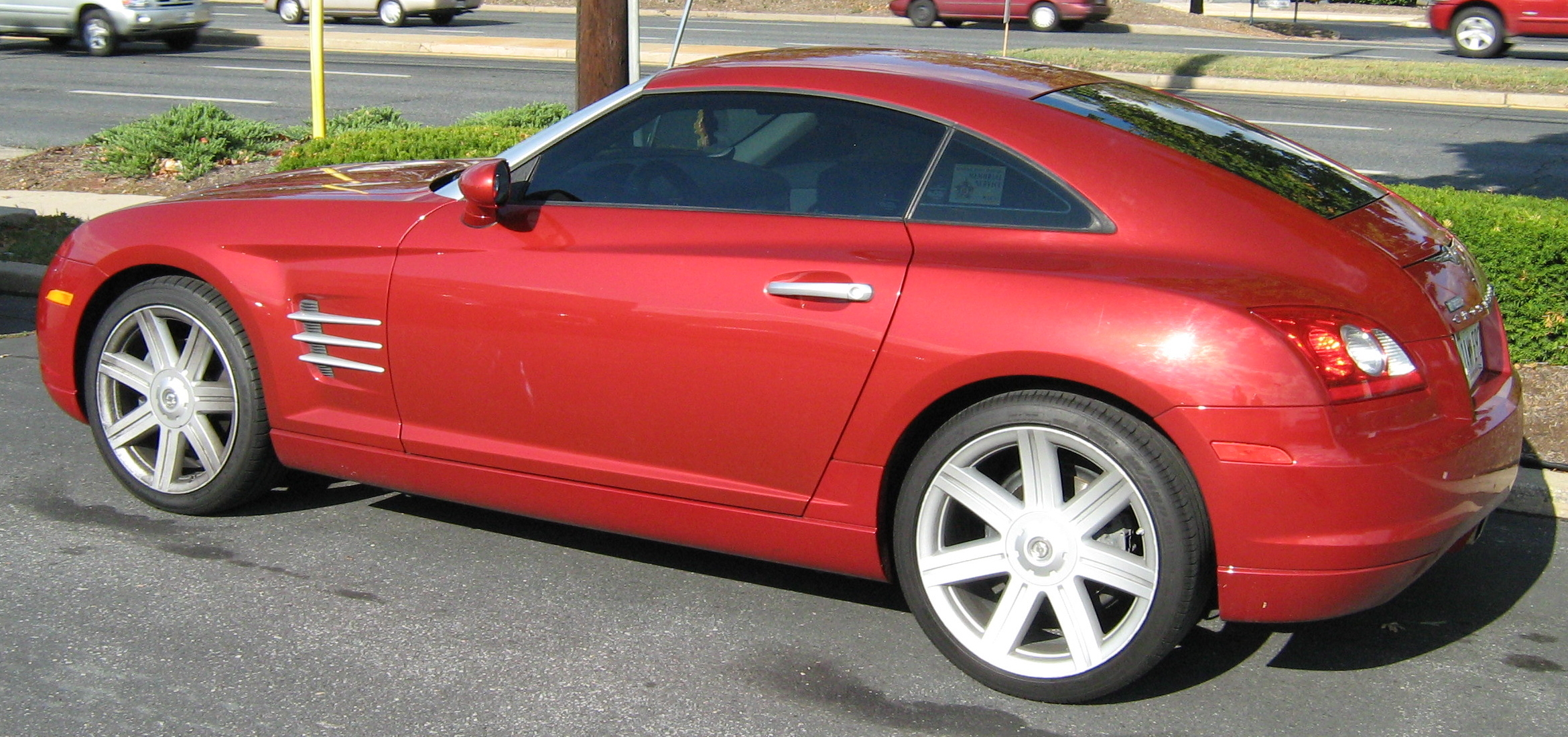
The "crossfire" character lines of the bodyside change direction of their creases on the door

The Chrysler Crossfire concept car was introduced at the 2001 North American International Auto Show. The production version was unveiled at the 2002 Los Angeles Auto Show as a 2004 model and "is as faithful a translation from concept to production as any in recent memory." The concept car was designed "to evoke a strong, passionate, emotional response. We had to retain that. We want to polarize our audience—we want people to love it or hate it."

Conceived as a two-seat halo car for the Chrysler brand, the objective was to use available components on a two-seat roadster chassis. The production car shares about 39% of its parts with Mercedes-Benz vehicles and Chrysler dealers were required to invest in special equipment, tools, and parts to be able to market the new luxury model. The rear-wheel-drive Crossfire coupe styling objective was for a "unique, almost sculptural" design.

The Crossfire's styling includes a wide stance with 19-inch rear wheels and 18-inch front wheels. Automotive journalists compared the Crossfire to American Motors' 1965–1967 AMC Marlin. Noted journalist, Paul Leinert said the "distinctive boat-tail rear end reminds more than one observer of the old Rambler Marlin." For example, Rob Rothwell wrote "... when I first espied the rear lines of the Chrysler Crossfire I was instantly transported back to 1965 and my favorite car of that year, the Rambler Marlin." Motor Trend also compared the "provocative boattail theme" of the 2004 Crossfire's sheetmetal to that of the AMC Marlin fastback. The Crossfire's tail is "formed as the edges of the roof converge into a kind of teardrop shape, leaving the rear fenders to flare out over the rear wheels."

Chrysler said the Crossfire took inspiration from the 1930s Art Deco period and buildings such as the Chrysler Building. Motor Trend cites vehicle influences from 1930s including Bugattis and Talbot Lagos.

The objective for Chrysler was to "give the brand a touch of class would be a thoroughly modern, European-edged sports car in its range – something that could compete against the raft of roadsters on the market". Furthermore, the car was to be "plush" and "refined", rather than a "boy racer".

== Mechanical design ==
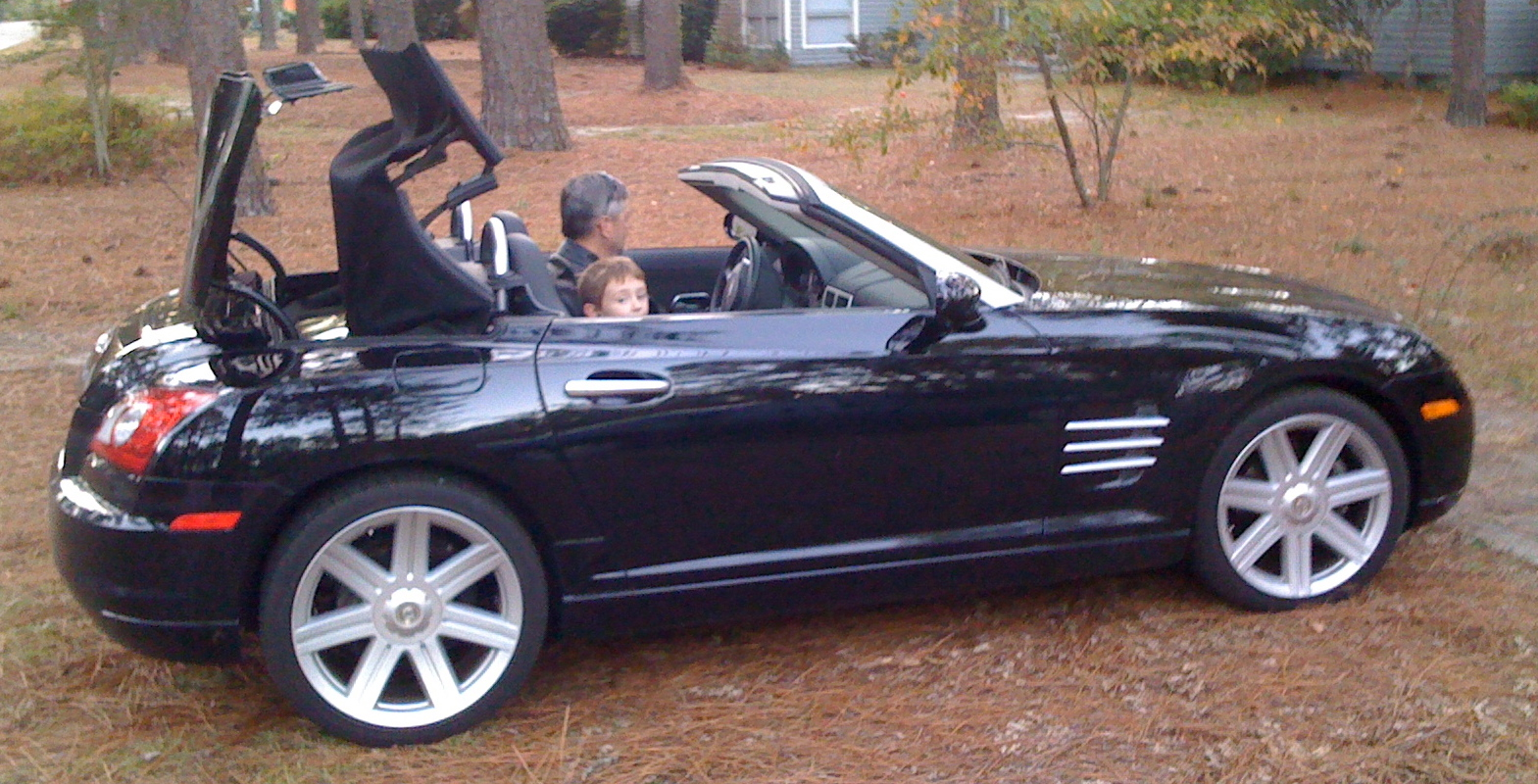
Power-operated convertible top in action

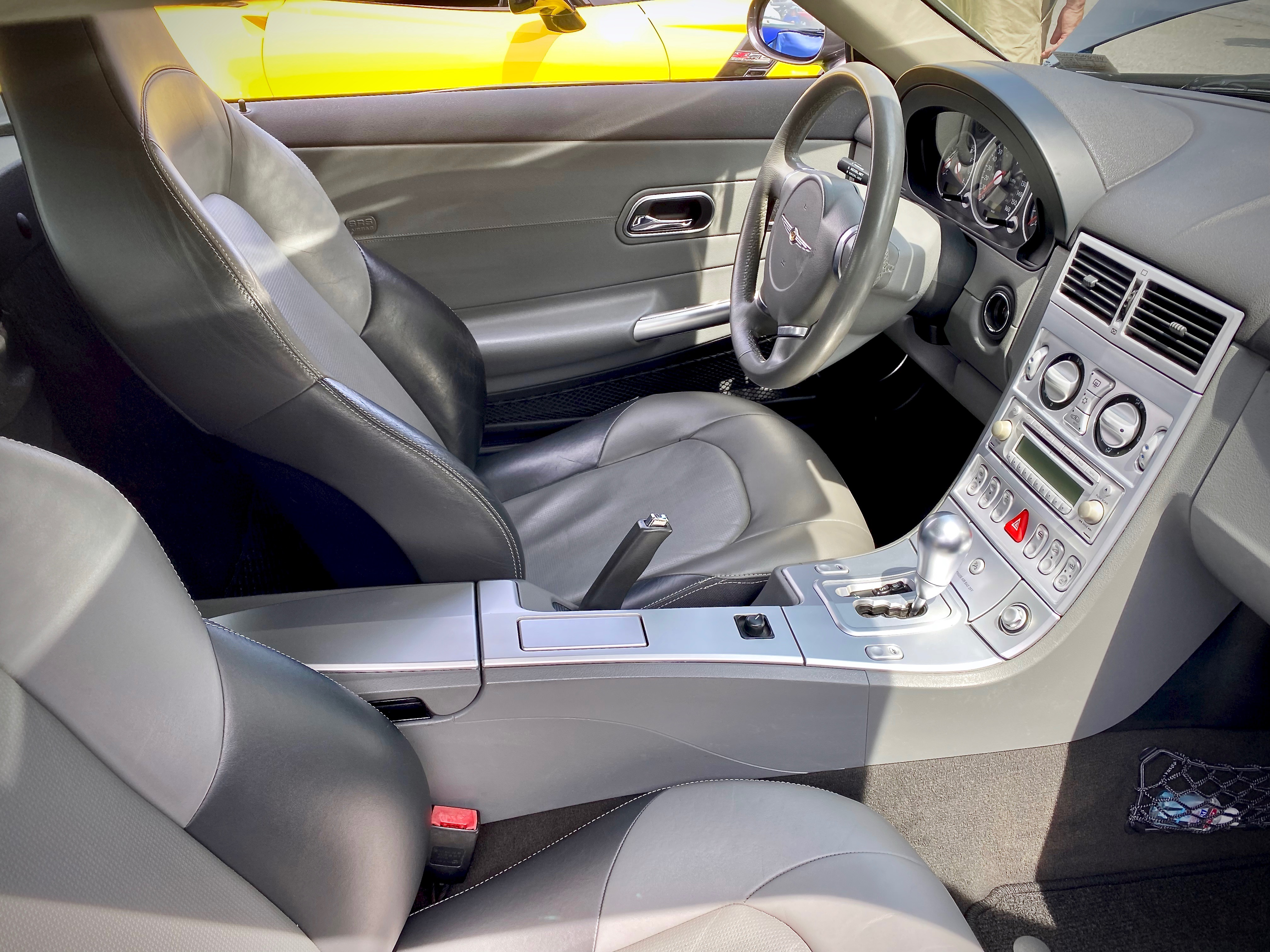
Interior

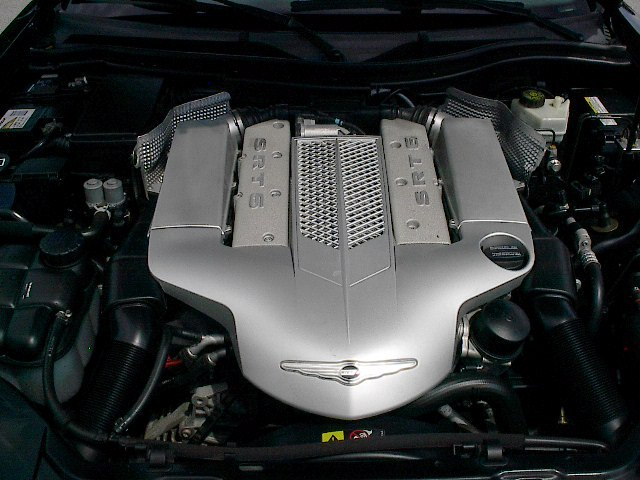
2005 Crossfire SRT-6 engine bay

Chrysler executed the interior and exterior styling. All other elements of the car such as wheelbase, track, engine, transmission, chassis structure, suspension components, are shared with the R170 platform. For example, the engine bay of the Crossfire is virtually identical to the Mercedes-Benz SLK320 on the R170 platform. The seats from the Mercedes-Benz SLK320 would bolt directly into the Crossfire chassis. The dashboard layout, controls, and instruments are also similar to those on the Mercedes-Benz SLK320.

The standard transmission is a 6-speed manual with an optional 5-speed automatic. Base (standard) and Limited models, originally offered beginning in the 2004 model year, were equipped with a Mercedes-Benz M112 3.2 L, 18-valve, SOHC V6 engine that was rated by Chrysler at 215 hp (160 kW) and 229 pound force-feet (310 N⋅m) of torque.

The SRT-6 models were equipped with a supercharged version of the M112 engine built by Mercedes' performance branch, AMG. The SRT-6 models came only with the 5-speed automatic transmission, consistent with AMG cars of the same era. The 6-speed transmission used by the Chrysler Crossfire is a variant of the Mercedes sourced NSG-370. The 5-speed automatic transmission in the Crossfire (known as 5G-Tronic) is also Mercedes-sourced and a variant of the 722.6 family. The automatic transmission-equipped Crossfires achieve a better EPA fuel efficiency rating over the 6MT, mostly due to the difference in gear ratios.

The Crossfire uses the recirculating ball steering system from the R170 platform. Front suspension is unequal length (SLA) double wishbone suspension with 5 point multi-link in the rear. As with the concept car, all Crossfire models used two different wheel sizes measuring 18x7.5-inch on the front and 19x9-inch on the rear. Standard all-season tires were 225/40R18 on the front and 255/35R19 on the rear.

The first production Crossfire was assembled on 3 February 2003, and driven off the production line by Chrysler Group's COO Wolfgang Bernhard in Germany.

== Equipment ==
The Chrysler Crossfire's standard features included large alloy wheels with performance-rated tires, a Becker–sourced AM/FM stereo with anti-theft system and a single-disc CD player, keyless entry with security alarm, a power-retractable rear wing spoiler, leather-trimmed seating surfaces, dual power front sports bucket seats, full instrumentation, a 3.2 L V6 engine with a manual transmission, rear-wheel-drive (RWD), a leather-wrapped and stitched steering wheel, a power-retractable cloth convertible roof (for convertible models), front floor mats, and air conditioning.

Optional features included an automatic transmission, a six-speaker premium Infinity sound system with two "subwoofers" mounted directly behind each seat, a CD-based GPS navigational system, exterior paint colors, and additional interior color choices.

== Sales and production numbers ==
The original contract with Karmann to build the Crossfire was for about five years with an annual sales target of 20,000 units in the United States. Sales of the Crossfire were slow, with an average 230-day supply of the vehicles during November 2005. A small number of Crossfires were imported to the United States and Mexico in 2006 (and almost all of these were roadsters).

Chrysler discontinued the Crossfire after the 2008 model year, as part of its restructuring plans. The last Crossfire was assembled on 17 December 2007.

Officially recognized production numbers by model year by Chrysler and Crossfire International Car Club Incorporated
Model Type / Year	2004	2005	2006	2007	2008	Totals
Crossfire Coupe	0	1,807	770	434	0	3,011
Crossfire Limited Coupe	22,801	9,027	2,155	1,063	826	35,872
Crossfire Limited Coupe (RHD)	2,322	983	591	128	0	4,024
Crossfire Limited Roadster (LHD & RHD)	0	18,501	4,281	1,905	960	25,647
Crossfire Roadster	0	1,806	780	803	0	3,389
Crossfire SRT-6 Coupe	0	2,419	47	0	0	2,466
Crossfire SRT-6 Coupe (RHD)	0	26	79	0	0	105
Crossfire SRT-6 Roadster	0	1,252	69	0	0	1,321
Crossfire SRT-6 Roadster (RHD)	0	78	101	0	0	179
Totals	25,123	35,899	8,873	4,333	1,786	76,014

Notes:
LHD = Left hand drive (steering wheel on the left side)
RHD = Right hand drive (steering wheel on the right side)
Crossfire Coupe and Crossfire Roadster refer to the "Base" model

Year	2003	2004	2005	2006	2007
Production	35,700	28,000	12,500	4,805	2,000

Note: Cars produced in one calendar year may be marketed as the following model year.

== Models ==
Model	Years	Engine	Displacement	Power	Torque	Handling	0-60 mph (97 km/h)	Top speed
Limited	2004–2008	3.2 L V6	195.2 cu in (3199 cc)	215 hp (160 kW; 218 PS)	229 lb⋅ft (310 N⋅m)	Skid pad 1.0g 70 – 0 mph in 161 ft.	6.4 sec (6-speed manual)	155 mph (electronically limited)
Base (Standard)	2005–2008	3.2 L V6	195.2 cu in (3199 cc)	215 hp (160 kW; 218 PS)	229 lb⋅ft (310 N⋅m)	Skid pad 1.0g 70 – 0 mph in 161 ft.	6.4 sec (6-speed manual)	155 mph (electronically limited)
SRT-6	2005–2006	Supercharged 3.2 L V6	195.2 cu in (3199 cc)	330 hp (246 kW; 335 PS)	310 lb⋅ft (420 N⋅m)	Skid pad 1.0g 70 – 0 mph in 157 ft.	4.8 sec (5-speed automatic)	155 mph (electronically limited)

=== Base and Limited ===
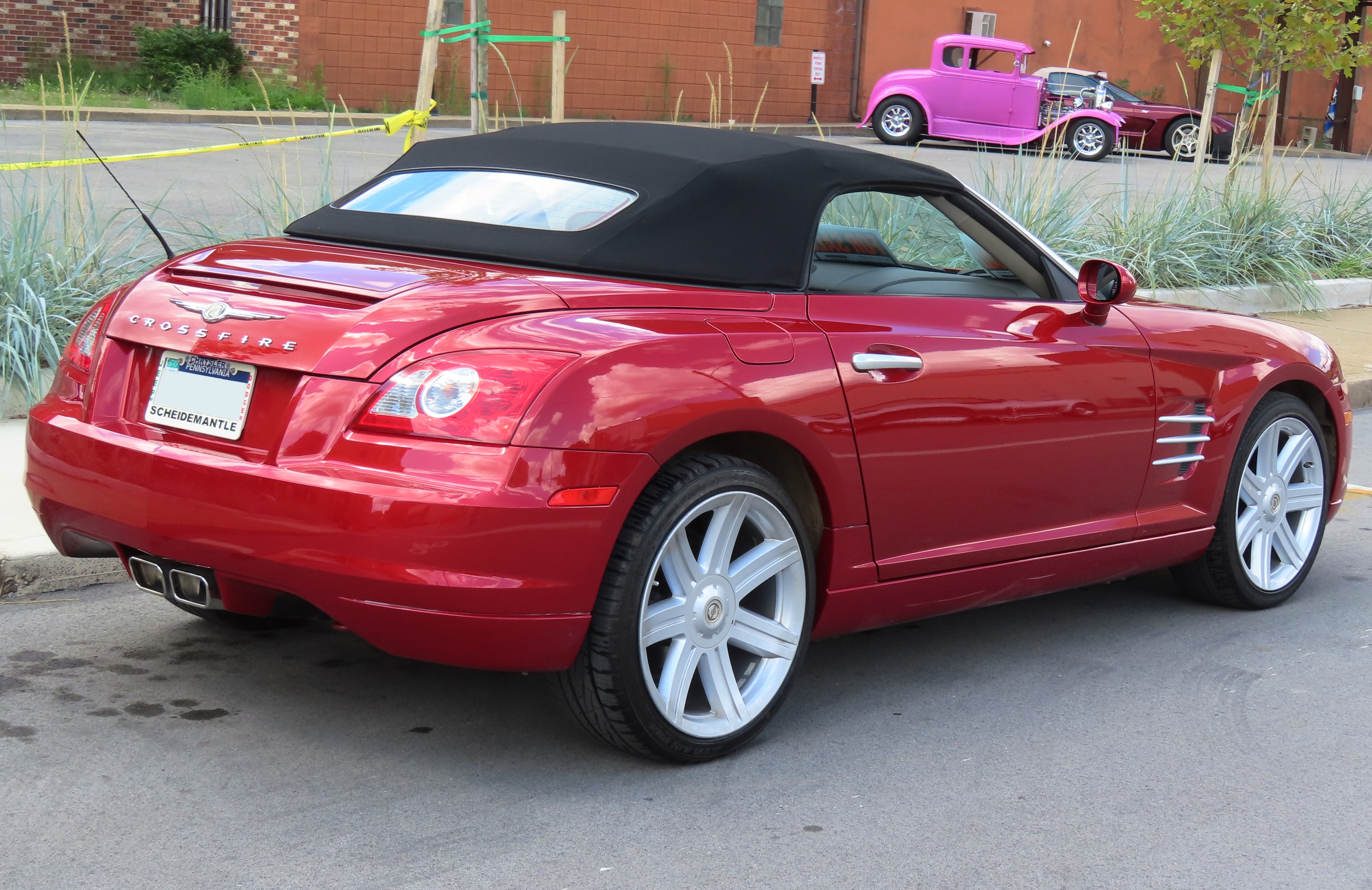
2005 Chrysler Crossfire Limited Roadster

For the 2004 model year, only the coupe was offered in a single trim level, equipped similarly to the following year's Limited model.

For model year 2005 model year; Coupe and Roadster configurations were available, each with three ascending trim levels: Base, Limited, and SRT-6 (supercharged). Base Crossfires, Coupe or Roadster, featured matte black painted windshield frames, black filler plugs (in place of fog lights) in the front fascia, and fabric seats with separate, movable headrests. Limited and SRT-6 models, both Coupe and Roadster, all featured silver-painted windshield frames and are equipped with fog lights. The Limited trim level featured leather upholstery. The SRT-6 model offered leather/Alcantara upholstery. All Base and Limited Crossfire models included an electronic rear wing that would automatically deploy at about 65 mph and descend at 45 mph. A manual override switch raised or lowered the spoiler at any speed.

For model years 2006-2007, an SE Roadster model (essentially a base model) was offered in Blaze Red Crystal Pearl and with black accented 15-spoke SRT-6 style wheels.

=== SRT-6 ===
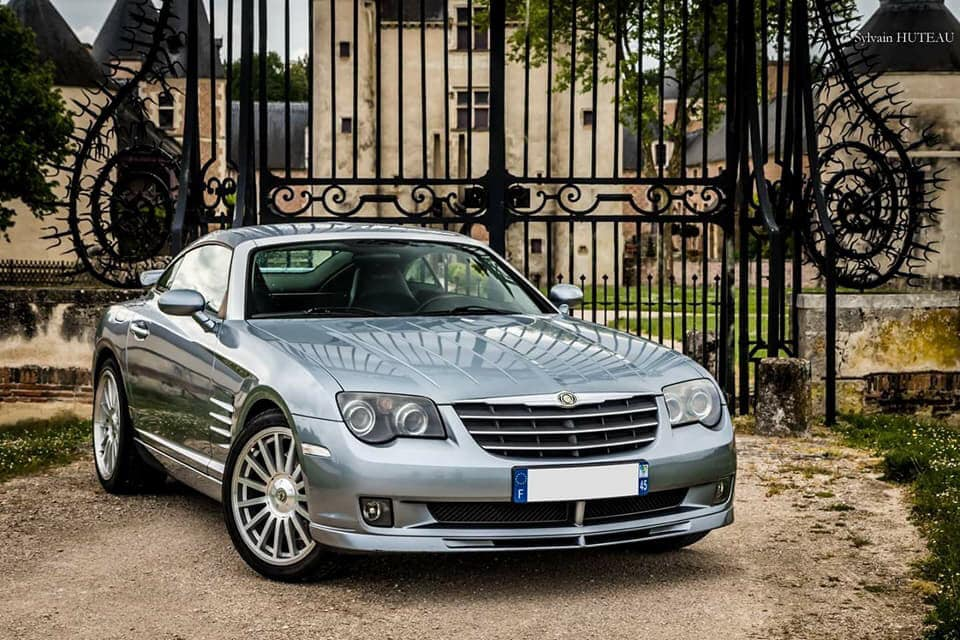
2005 Crossfire SRT-6 Coupe in Sapphire Silver Blue

The SRT-6 trim level, available as a coupe and convertible, featured a Mercedes-Benz AMG M112 3.2 L V6 supercharged engine delivering 330 hp (246 kW) and 310 lb⋅ft (420 N⋅m) of torque. Other SRT-6 model-specific features included suspension and brake modifications, a front fascia air dam, and a fixed rear spoiler. The SRT-6 used the same drivetrain, suspension, and braking components as those used on the Mercedes-Benz SLK 32 AMG. The standard tires were upgraded to Z-rated Michelin Pilot Sports, sized 225/40R18 on the front and 255/35R19s in the back. The SRT-6 cars did not feature the electronic wing that the Base and Standard cars featured.

For the 2006 model year, the SRT-6 was special order only.

== Safety ==
The National Highway Traffic Safety Administration (NHTSA ) crash test ratings (2004 and 2007, Coupe):

- Frontal Crash Test – Driver:
- Frontal Crash Test – Passenger:
- Side Impact Rating – Driver:
- Rollover Rating: 9.5%
