= Rambler Marlin =

Two-door car featuring a fastback by American Motors

Rambler Marlin; AMC Marlin
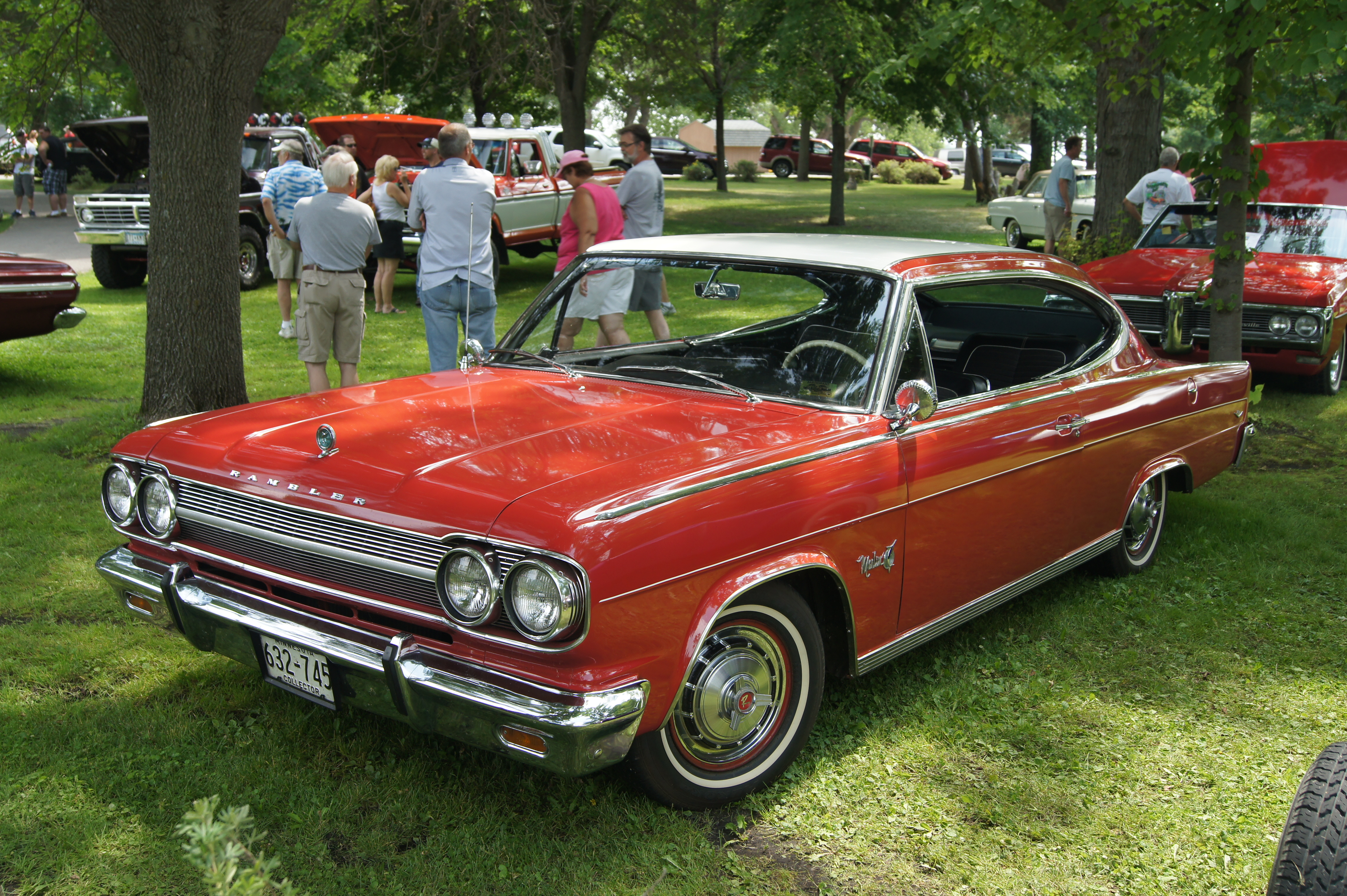
- 1965 Rambler Marlin

Overview
- Manufacturer: American Motors (AMC)
- Production: 1965–1967
- Assembly: United States Kenosha, Wisconsin (Kenosha Engine)
- Designer: Dick Teague

Body and chassis
- Class: Personal luxury car
- Body style: Fastback 2-door pillarless hardtop
- Layout: FR layout
- Platform: Rambler Classic: 1965–1966; AMC Ambassador: 1967

Chronology
- Successor: AMC Rebel/Matador: midsize; Ambassador: full-size luxury; Javelin: sporty pony car

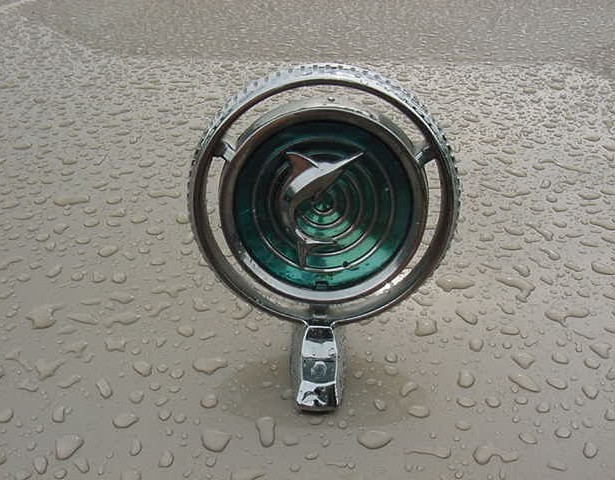
1965 and 1966 hood ornament

The Rambler Marlin (later AMC Marlin) is a two-door fastback automobile produced in the United States by American Motors Corporation from 1965 to 1967. A halo car for the company, it was marketed as a personal luxury car.

In 1965, the car was marketed as "Rambler Marlin". For 1966, the car featured "Marlin" identification only and was officially named "AMC Marlin", as was the 1967 model.

Its fastback roof design was previewed on the 1964 Rambler Tarpon show car, based on the compact Rambler American. The 1965 and 1966 model year production Marlins were fastback versions of the mid-sized two-door hardtop Rambler Classic, and 1967 brought a major redesign in which the car was given the new, longer AMC Ambassador full-sized chassis. This version had a longer hood and numerous improvements, including more interior room and new V8 engines.

== Origin ==
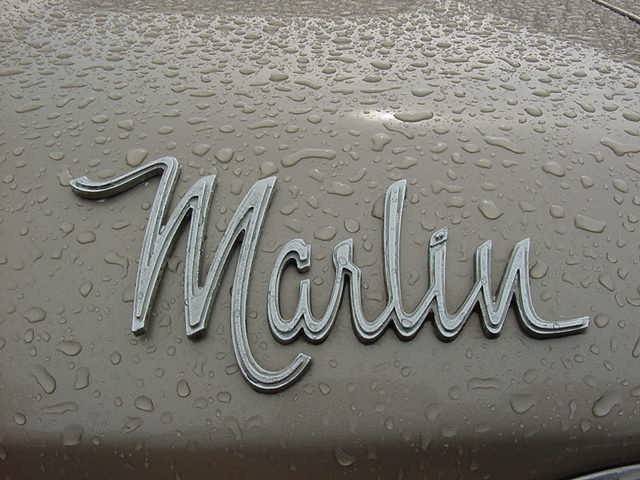
Marlin nameplate

As American prosperity increased in the early 1960s, the U.S. automobile market expanded. Whereas American Motors' profitable marketing strategy under George W. Romney had concentrated on compact, economical cars, Romney's successor as CEO, Roy Abernethy, sought to compete with the "Big Three" automobile manufacturers (General Motors, Ford, and Chrysler) by expanding AMC's model lines into additional market segments; particularly by developing a sporty, roomy, six-passenger sedan that would occupy a unique niche in the market. The idea was that the new car would be a distinctive, low-volume model symbolizing a new Rambler look and spearheading a full product line. To be a distinctive competitor to the Big Three, it should be flashy and intermediate-sized, and in an era when other automakers were stressing the power of muscle cars for their intermediate-sized image vehicles, the new model—the Marlin—was to feature comfort and spaciousness.

Initially, in response to a proposal for a sporty, youth-oriented car, a four-seat fastback design study, the Rambler Tarpon, had been built on the compact-sized Rambler American platform. This was shown as a concept car at various auto shows, but AMC's current "GEN-I" V8 engine would not fit in the comparatively small Rambler chassis; also, the new "GEN-II" V8 designs were still in development, and market research showed that a six-cylinder engine alone would not satisfy potential customers. Management at the small automaker wanted to change "its tune" with "a reasonably sporty 'upsized' response of sorts to Ford's Mustang." The "fastback" appearance was a revival of sedans built after World War II, as demonstrated by the 1940s Nash Ambassador.

Ultimately, and in line with Roy Abernethy's new marketing strategy, the decision was made to build the new fastback model on AMC's intermediate-sized Rambler Classic platform. The development team, under distinguished American designer Dick Teague, had to work with considerably smaller budgets than their counterparts at Detroit's Big Three to create the new Marlin. They created a large, roomy and luxurious fastback which incorporated a number of design features from the Tarpon show car. The signature roof line from the windshield with the Marlin's "skylight permits carrying through the true fastback line in an unbroken sweep." However, the roof was raised over the rear passenger area when Abernethy, who was six-foot-four (193 cm tall), insisted on being able to sit in the back seat of the design studies. Teague worked for Chrysler as a stylist during the mid-1950s and the fastback-styling of the lost 1956 Chrysler Norseman concept car's "resemblance to (that of) the 1965 Rambler Marlin fastback coupe, or vice versa, was (said to be) uncanny."

As the Marlin was targeted at the evolving "personal luxury" segment, its long list of standard equipment was supplemented by numerous options that enabled buyers to personalize their car.

== 1965 ==
First generation
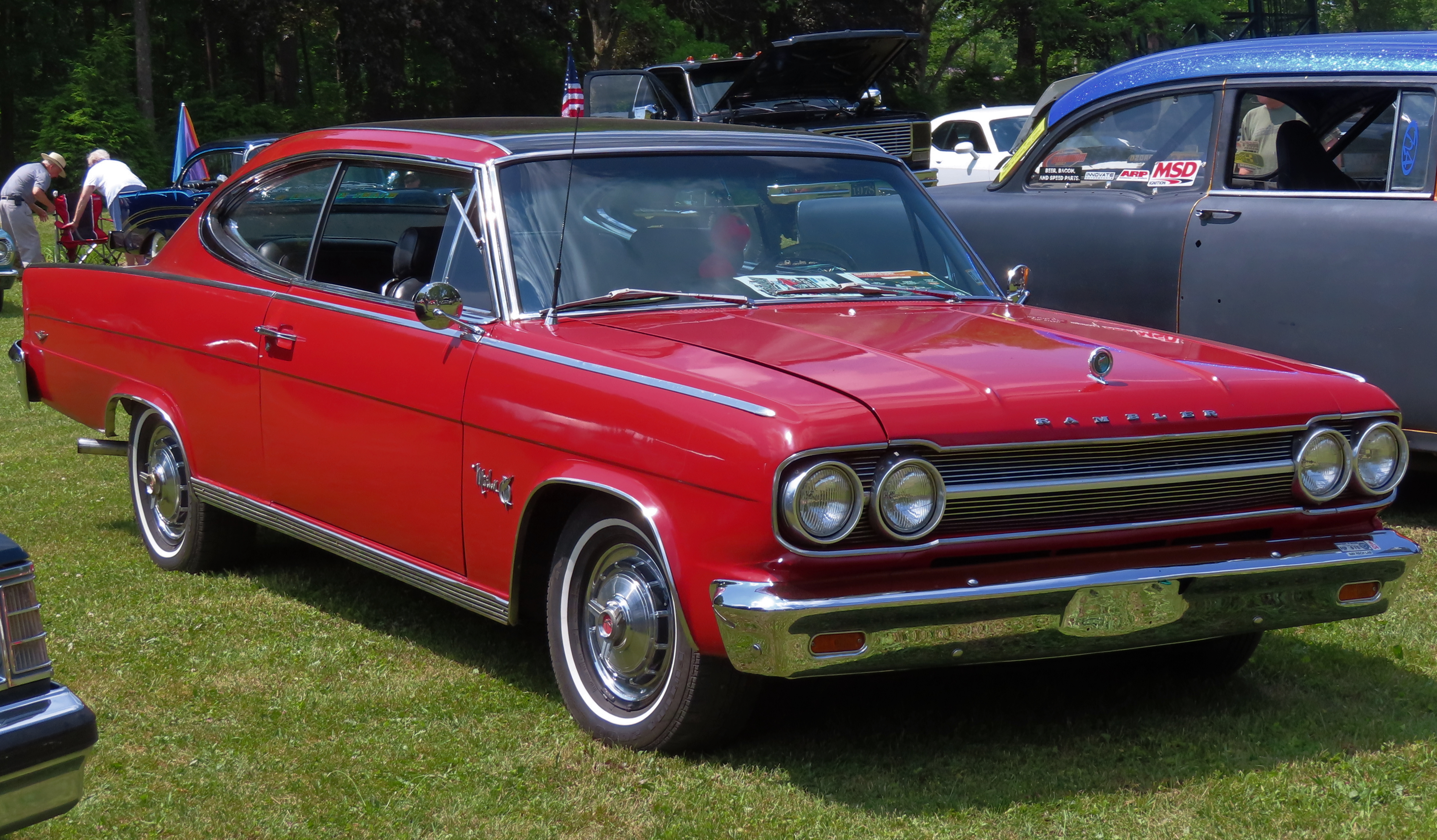

Overview
- Also called: Rambler Marlin (1965); AMC Marlin (1966)
- Production: 1965–1966, total of 14,874 built

Body and chassis
- Class: Mid-size personal luxury car
- Related: Rambler Classic

Powertrain
- Engine: 232 cu in (3.8 L) 155 hp (116 kW; 157 PS) I6 2-bbl; 287 cu in (4.7 L) 189 hp (141 kW; 192 PS) V8 2-bbl; 327 cu in (5.4 L) 250 hp (186 kW; 253 PS) V8 2-bbl; 327 cu in (5.4 L) 270 hp (201 kW; 274 PS) V8 4-bbl
- Transmission: 3-speed manual; 3-speed with overdrive; "Twin-Stick" on console (1965); 4-speed manual (1966); 3-speed automatic; 3-speed "Shift-Command" on console

Dimensions
- Wheelbase: 112 in (2,845 mm)
- Length: 195 in (4,953 mm)
- Width: 74.5 in (1,892 mm)
- Height: 53 in (1,346 mm)
- Curb weight: 2,992 lb (1,357 kg) V8

=== Launch ===
American Motors billed the Marlin as a new addition to the company's self-styled "Sensible Spectaculars" model line. Backed by extensive advertising and merchandising, the car was officially announced on 10 February 1965, and unveiled in Rambler dealer showrooms on 19 March.

New car introductions, more significant in the 1960s than today, were often accompanied by special invitations and heavy publicity. The Marlin was advertised in 2,400 newspapers on its launch day, and American Motors' news releases positioned it as aimed at buyers wanting a sporty fastback that was also roomy and comfortable. This contrasted it with the smaller Barracuda and Mustang fastbacks that had arrived a year earlier. AMC's first model following the muscle car launches of the 1960s, the Marlin was intended to fill a niche left by their competitors. Within a year, Chrysler would enter that marketplace with the Dodge Charger, and a year later Ford, with the Mercury Cougar.

The initial Rambler Marlin advertisements stated "now in limited production." Every dealership received one or two units to increase showroom traffic, whereas the production numbers are a direct reflection upon the actual number of Rambler automobile dealers and AMC sent bulletins to dealerships telling "How to use Marlin to sell the Rambler Classic." According to Tom Coupe, AMC's vice-president for sales, "the basic reason we produced the Marlin, is to attract attention to American Motors."

The Marlin followed the signature design features of the Ford Galaxie "Sports Roof", the Plymouth Barracuda, the Mustang 2+2, and the 1965 fastback models from General Motors, including the Chevrolet Impala "Sport Coupe" versions. A book on American muscle cars says V8-powered Marlins provided appropriate performance for the streamlined appearance.

=== Press reaction ===
The new model met with a mixed reception in the press. Popular Mechanics magazine recorded 0 to 60 mph in 10.8 seconds by manually shifting the automatic transmission, and fuel economy of 18.14 mpg_{‑US} (12.97 L/100 km; 21.79 mpg_{‑imp}) at a steady 60 mph (97 km/h). Tom McCahill's road test in Mechanics Illustrated recorded 0 to 60 mph in 9.7 seconds with the 327 engine.

Motor Trend magazine found the Marlin well balanced and said it added to the market's various personal performance sports cars. The San Francisco Chronicle praised it and noted effortless cruising at 80 mph (129 km/h)." Hot Rod magazine ran the quarter-mile in 17.43 seconds at 79 mph (127 km/h) with the 327 cu in (5.4 L) and "Flash-O-Matic" transmission.

The Marlin emphasized the stretched-out hardtop (pillar-less) roofline that followed the contemporary styling vogue. Automobile Quarterly magazine thought the car very ugly and expressed dislike for the inadequacy of the rear-view window, the positions of the steering-wheel and stoplights, the softness of the front seats, and the design of the pedals.

=== Designer reaction ===
Vincent Geraci (who became chief of product design and product identity at Chrysler after AMC's buyout), viewed the Marlin as "an exciting program ... We took a 1965 body design and turned it into a sportier version. But enlarging the car from its original concept [the Tarpon] and raising the roof produced an adverse effect on overall appearance."

Carl Cameron, designer of the original Dodge Charger, named the Marlin as the only competition for his 1966 car even though, he said, the Marlin lacked some of the Charger's features and it was "very different". Contrary to the view that the Charger was a "clone" of the Marlin, Cameron said that the starting-point for his design was the fastback 1949 Cadillac, and that any similarity to the Marlin was coincidental. He added that as a result of the exceptionally tall Abernathy's insistence on being able to sit in the Marlin's back seat, "those cars had big squared-off roofs" whereas the Charger's roof treatment was "rounded off, much more pleasing to the eye."

=== Vehicle appointments and options ===
Standard features, which focused on comfort and luxurious appearance, included deluxe exterior trim, individual reclining front seats, front and rear center armrests when bucket seats were selected, and interiors from AMC's two-door Ambassador model, including dashboard and instrument panel. On the Marlin, the dashboard was trimmed with engine-turned aluminum. Interior door panels were finished with carpeting and stainless steel trim, when many cars at the time had cheaper stamped vinyl glued to cardboard. Retractable front seatbelts were optional. The reclining bucket seats could be ordered with headrests. The Marlin was also one of the first American automobiles with front disc brakes (four-piston design, by Bendix) as standard. It had drum brakes without servo assistance on the rear.

A total of 2,005 Marlins were built with the smallest engine option, a 145 hp (108 kW; 147 PS) 232 I6. The AMC-designed 270 hp (201 kW; 274 PS) 327 cu in (5.4 L) 4-barrel V8, often paired with an automatic transmission that had the shifter in a floor console, accounted for 42% of total production, while less than 6%, regardless of engine option, had the innovative "Twin-Stick" manual transmission (with overdrive). The center console-mounted controls offered one longer stick for the regular gears, with a second shorter lever for overdrive selection. It can be shifted as a 5-speed: from 1st to 2nd, to 2nd+OD, to 3rd, to 3rd+OD. Other options included "Solex" tinted glass (70% of production), power steering, heavy-duty suspension, "Twin-Grip" limited-slip differential, air conditioning, adjustable steering wheel, power windows, and a choice of AM radio or an AM/FM monaural unit (50% of production) with "Duo Costic" rear speaker and "Vibra Tone" system to simulate stereophonic sound (stereo broadcasting was not yet widely available in the U.S.). Only 221 Marlins were built without a radio. Wide-ranging interior colors and upholstery choices were available, and options for the exterior, including accent colors for the roof and side window trim, enabled further customization.

=== Pricing and sales ===
The MSRP price was US$3,100 (US$31,671 in 2025 dollars), compared with $3,063 for a bench seat (six-passenger) version of the Rambler Classic 770 two-door hardtop, which did not have the extra features and luxurious interior of the Marlin. 10,327 Marlins were sold in the abbreviated first year of production.

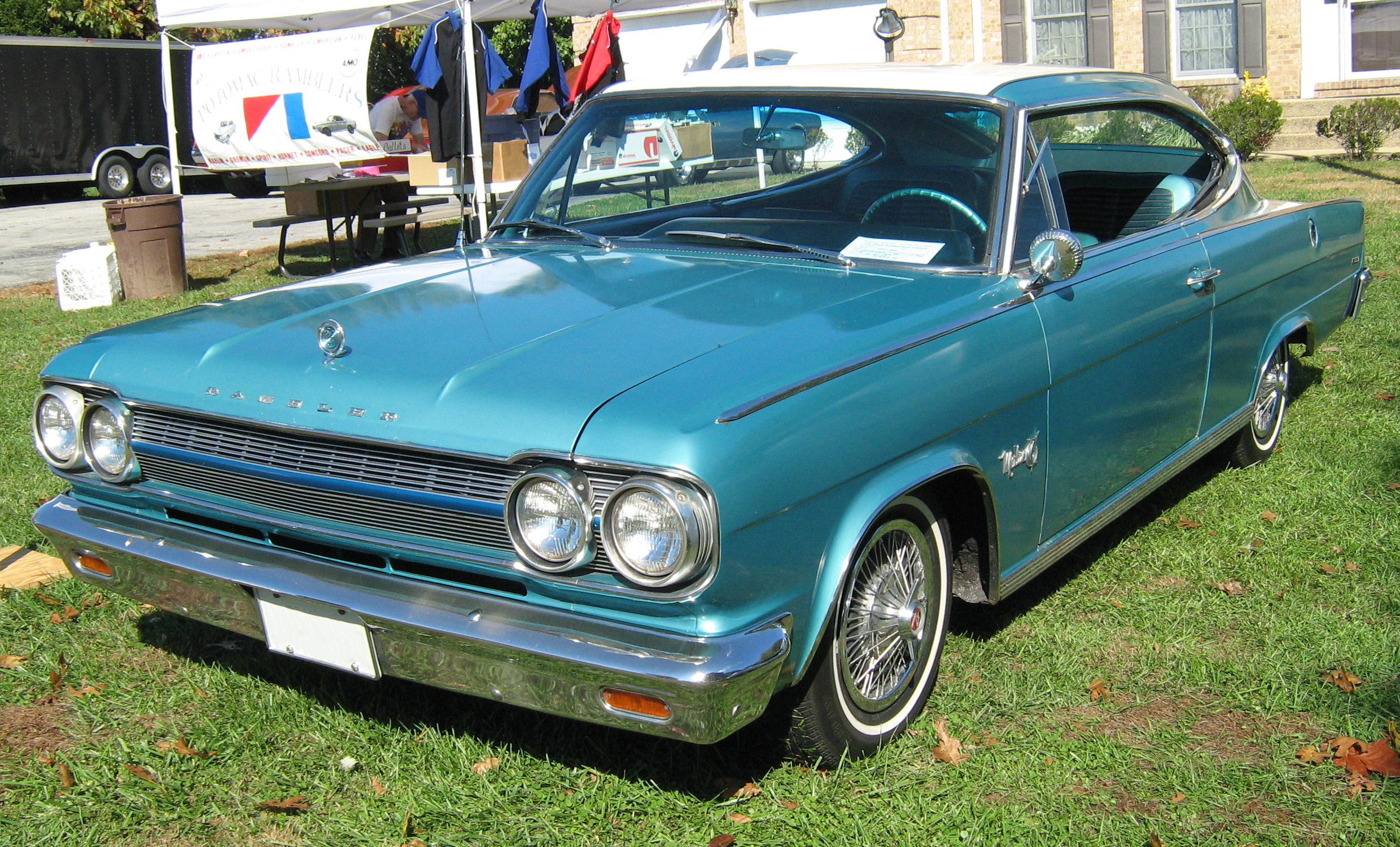
Only the 1965 Marlins had the "Rambler" nameplate on the hood and rear panel

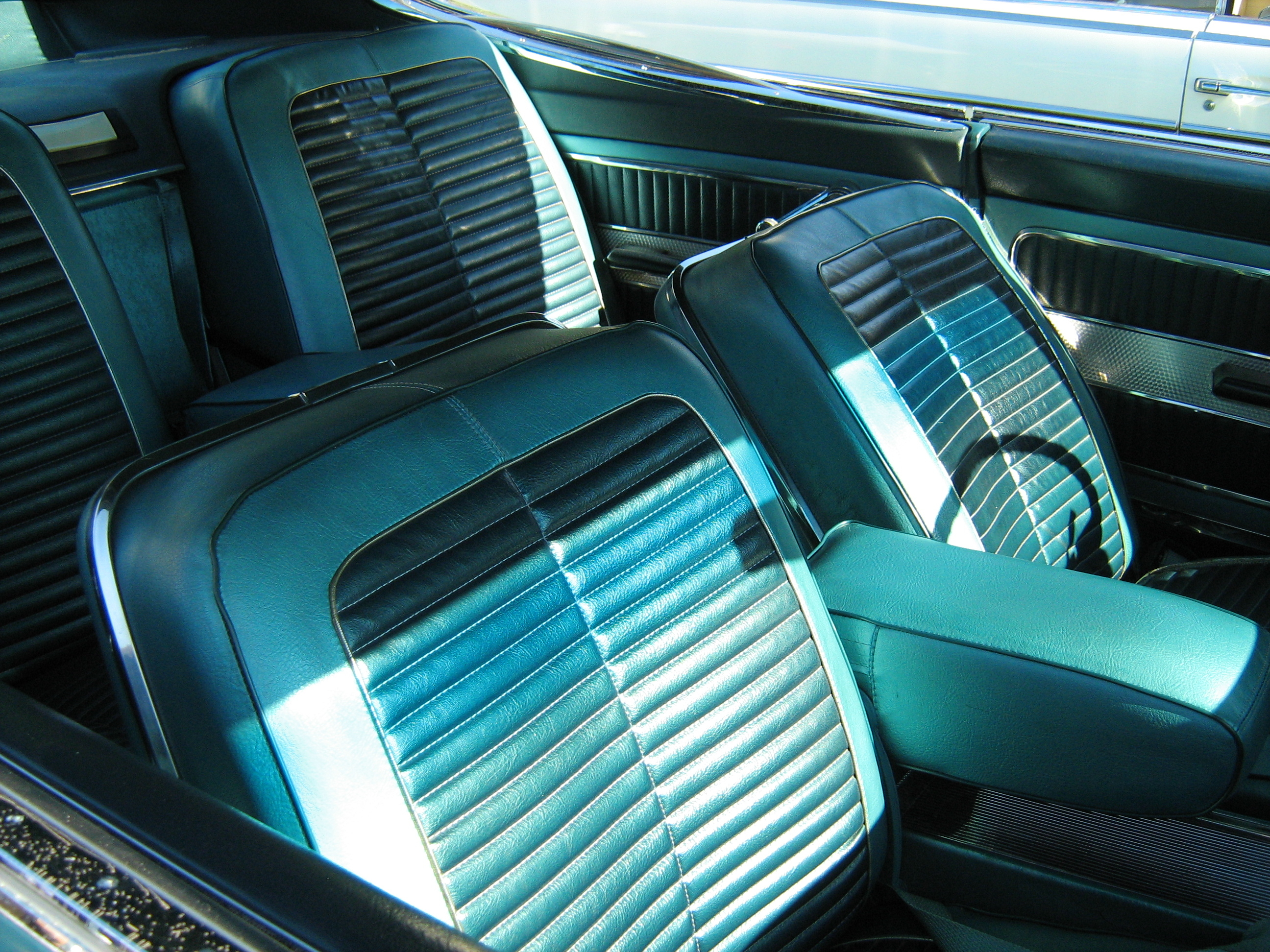
Front and rear armrests in a 1965 Marlin interior

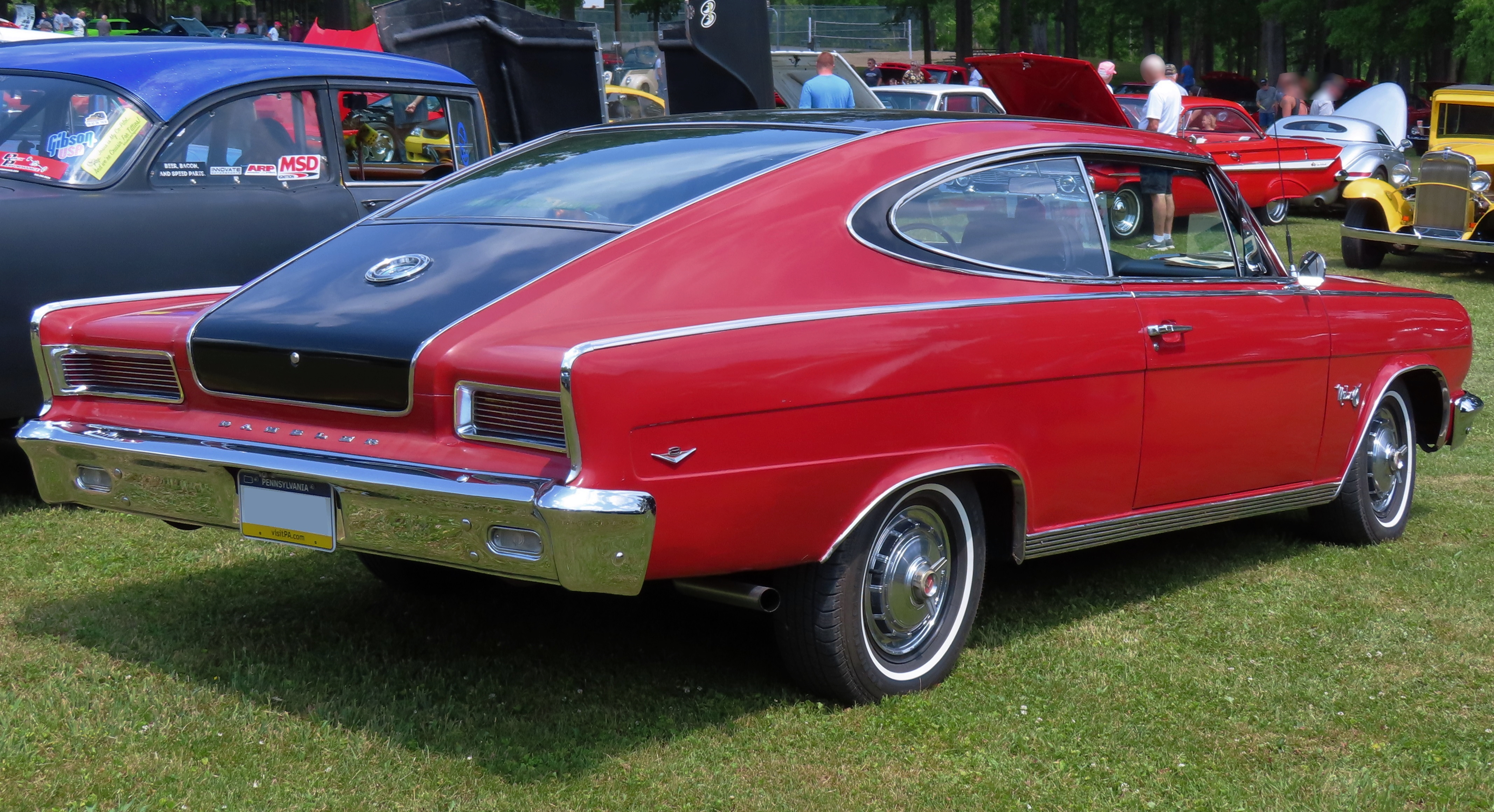
1965 Marlin rear styling

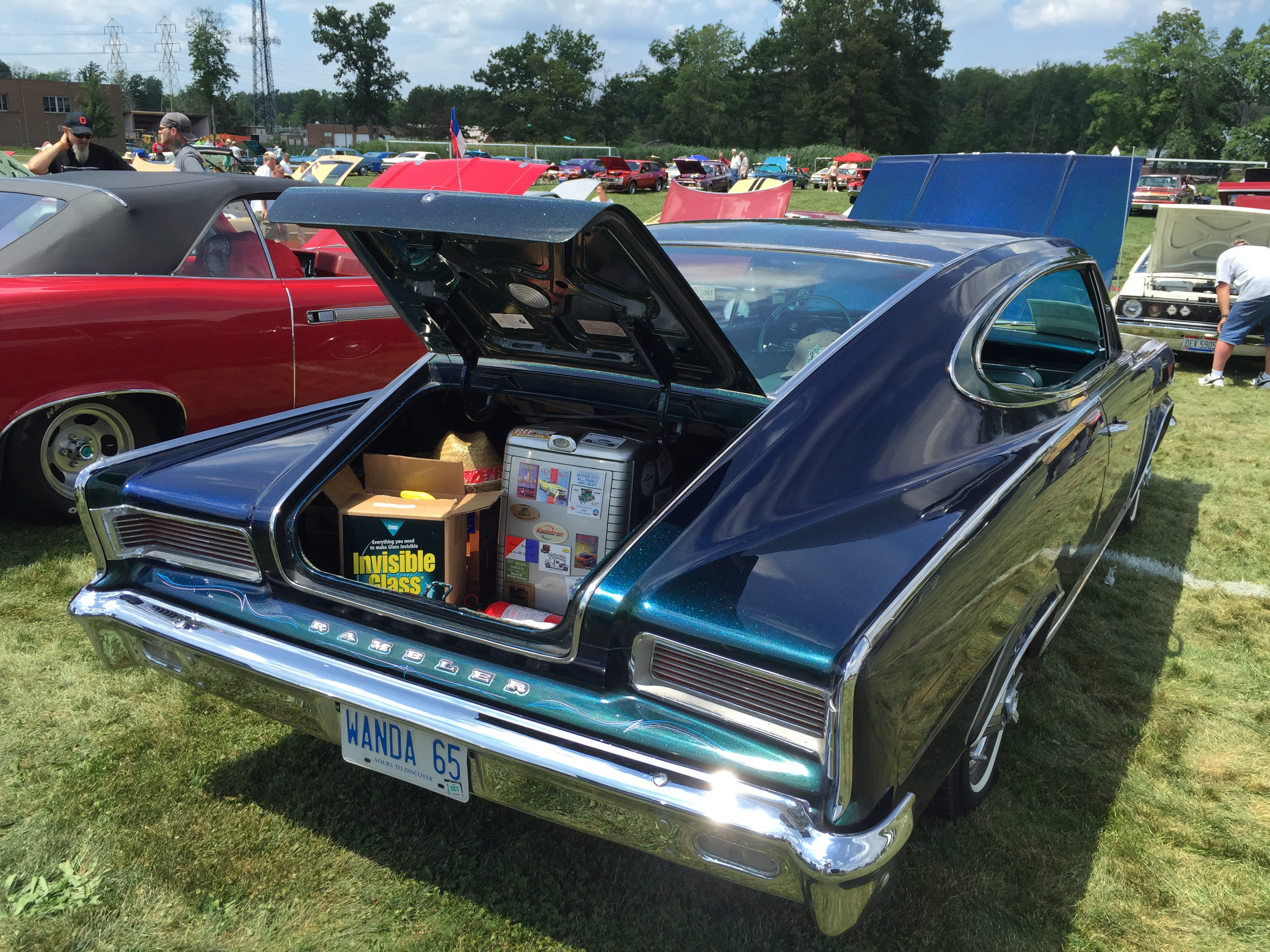
Distinctive trunk of a 1965 Marlin

== 1966 ==
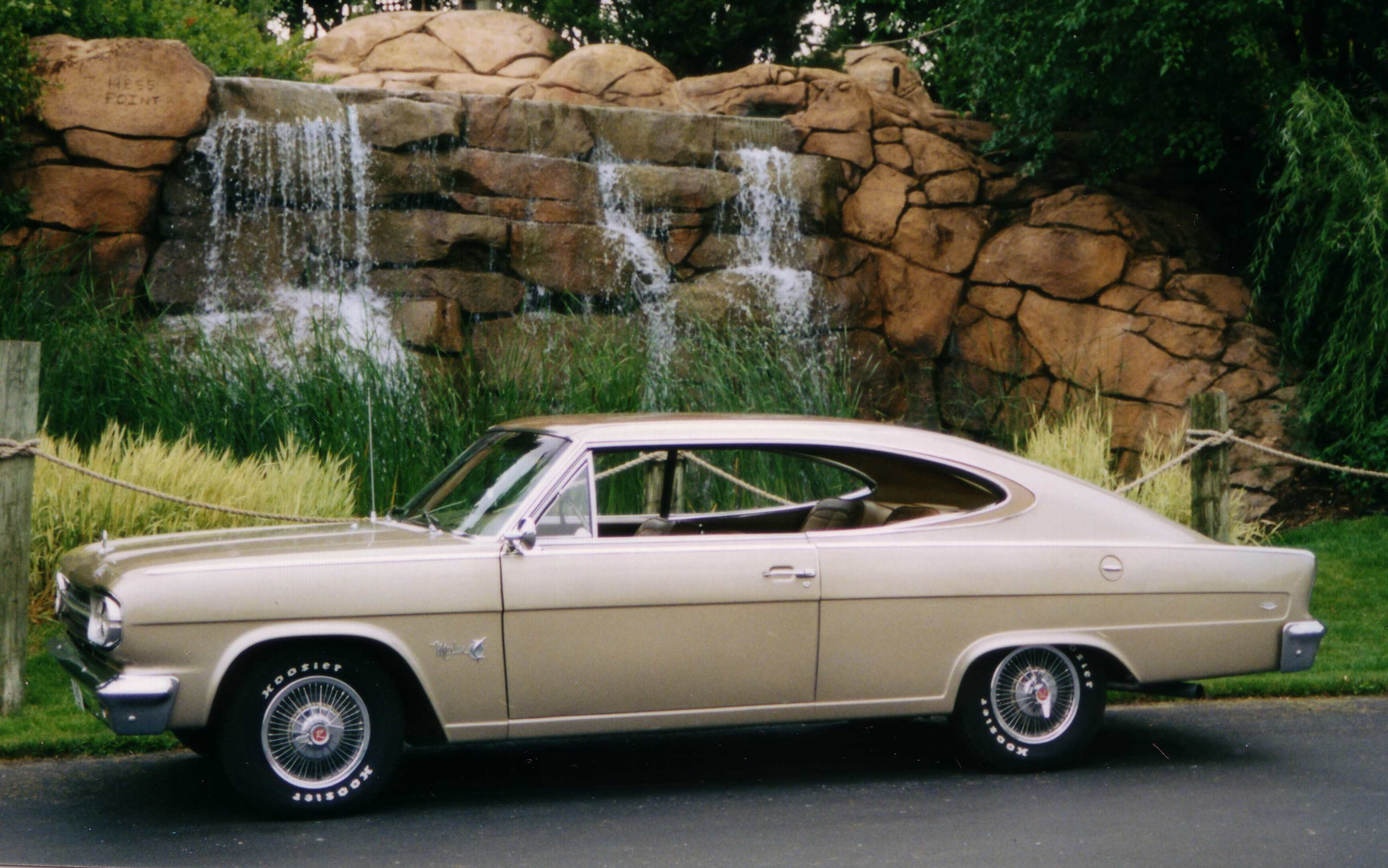
1966 AMC Marlin two-tone trim

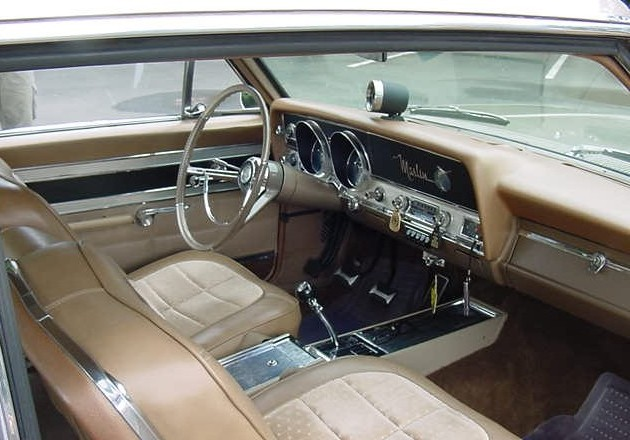
1966 model with the optional 4-speed manual

As part of Roy Abernethy's remake of AMC's corporate identity, divorcing the larger car lines from the historic Rambler brand that had "become synonymous with frugality" and the economy compact car image. The Rambler Marlin became known as the AMC Marlin starting with the 1966 model year. All references to "Rambler" were removed from the car and promotional materials. The other changes were minor (e.g. a slight modification to the extruded aluminum grille, a front sway bar made standard on six-cylinder models, and an optional black vinyl roof cover that continued over the trunk opening). New was an electronic tach on the top of the dash.

The year also saw the introduction of the fastback Dodge Charger, a derivative of the intermediate-sized Dodge Coronet, and a sporty model in direct response to the Marlin. The Charger "was immediately paired up in the automotive press with American Motors' year-old Marlin, another fastback specialty machine." "The fastback Charger had been introduced in mid-season of 1966 in retaliation to the AMC Marlin, Mustang, and Plymouth's Barracuda". Together, the intermediate-sized Charger and Marlin were "unusual, distinctive and in a class by themselves." General Motors and Ford also positioned products similar to the Marlin as specialized "personal luxury" coupes and introduced 2-door fastback versions of their full- and intermediate-sized car lines.

AMC broadened the car's market appeal by lowering the base price to US$2,601 (US$25,810 in 2025 dollars) and offering more options. For example: high-level trim packages that had previously been standard, as well optional floor or center console mounted 4-speed manual transmission and a dash-mounted tachometer, affected small changes in pricing and equipment that paralleled the competition. By comparison, Chrysler did a similar thing with the pricing and content of its Dodge Charger from the 1966 to the 1967 model years. Despite these changes, Marlin production fell to 4,547 in 1966.

Popular Science magazine road test comparison of three 1966 sporty fastbacks (Ford Mustang, Plymouth Valiant, and AMC Marlin) highlighted the Marlin's quiet interior, high quality upholstery and positioned seats with adjustable backrests that "permit almost any driver to find an ideal seat-to-wheel-to-pedal relationship", as well as the "best-balanced ride on good roads and bad". The 287 cu in (4.7 L) two-barrel V8 engine with the three-speed automatic achieved 0 to 60 mph in 11.7 seconds, and was the quietest, but least responsive of the group. The test Marlin's standard drum brakes were criticized as inadequate, with the authors recommending the optional disk brakes.

== 1967 ==
Second generation
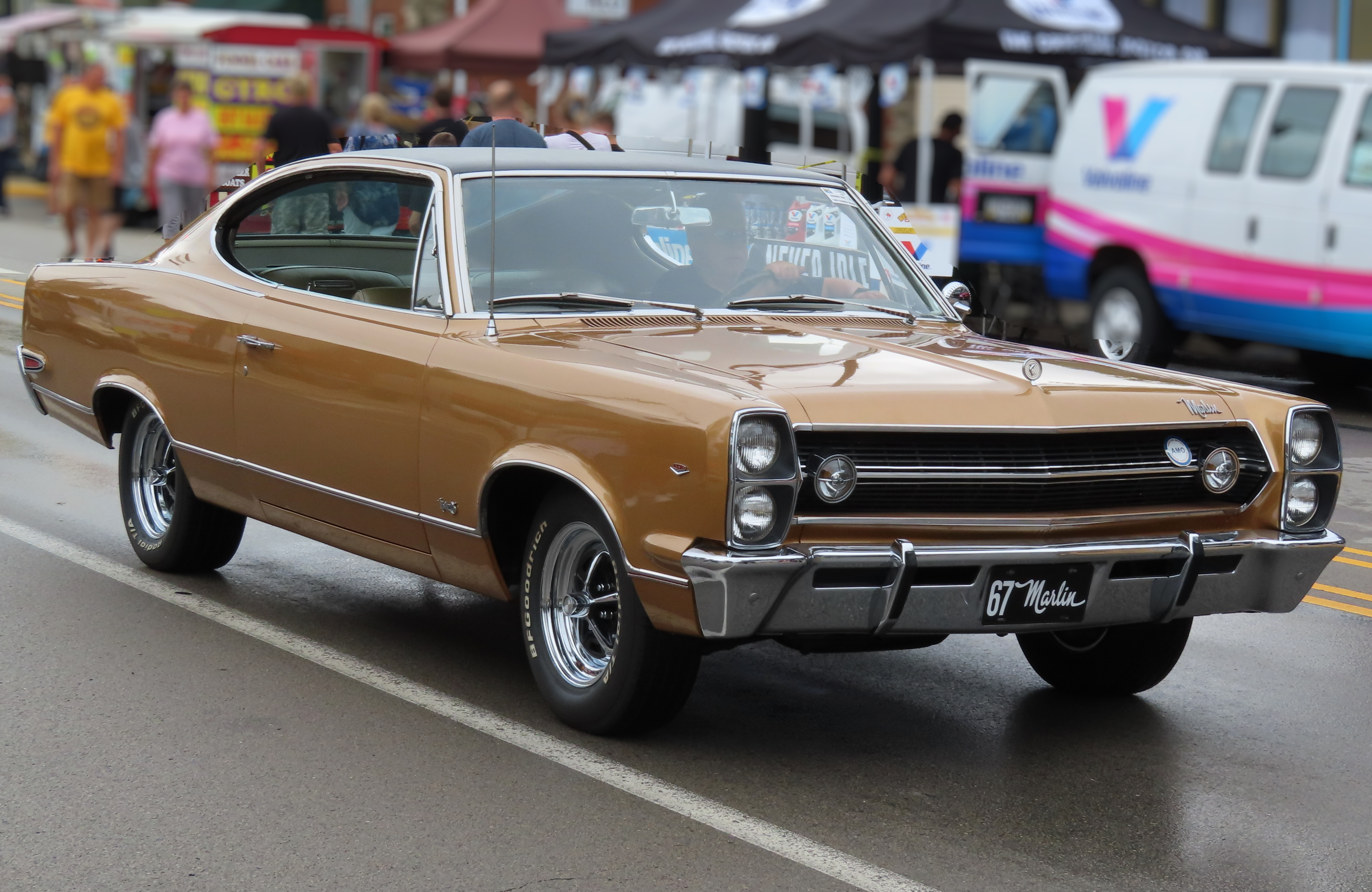

Overview
- Production: 1966–1967, total of 2,545 built

Body and chassis
- Class: Full-size personal luxury car
- Related: AMC Ambassador

Powertrain
- Engine: 232 cu in (3.8 L) 155 hp (116 kW; 157 PS) I6 2-bbl; 290 cu in (4.8 L) 200 hp (149 kW; 203 PS) V8 2-bbl; 343 cu in (5.6 L) 235 hp (175 kW; 238 PS) V8 2-bbl; 343 cu in (5.6 L) 280 hp (209 kW; 284 PS) V8 4-bbl
- Transmission: 3-speed manual; 3-speed with overdrive; 4-speed manual 3-speed automatic; 3-speed "Shift-Command" on console

Dimensions
- Wheelbase: 118 in (2,997 mm)
- Length: 201.5 in (5,118 mm)
- Width: 78 in (1,981 mm)
- Height: 53 in (1,346 mm)
- Curb weight: 3,342 lb (1,516 kg) V8

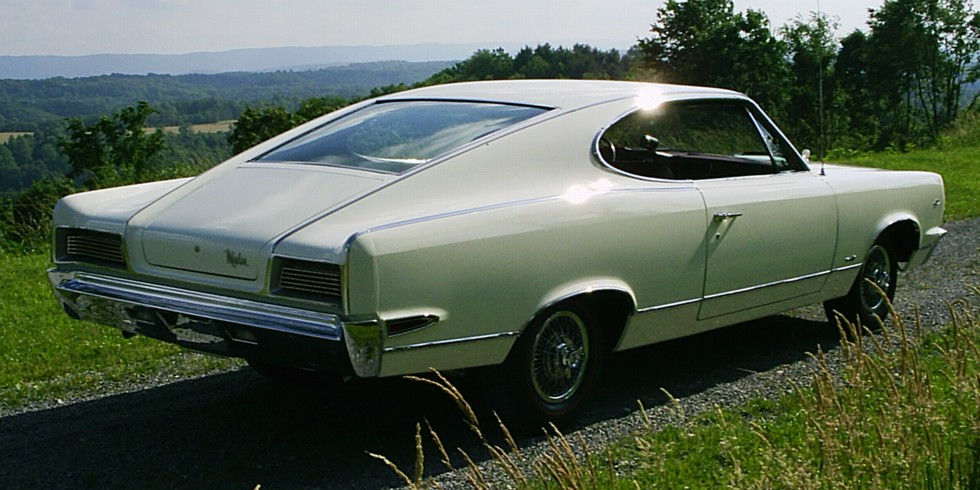
1967 model was larger, less angular

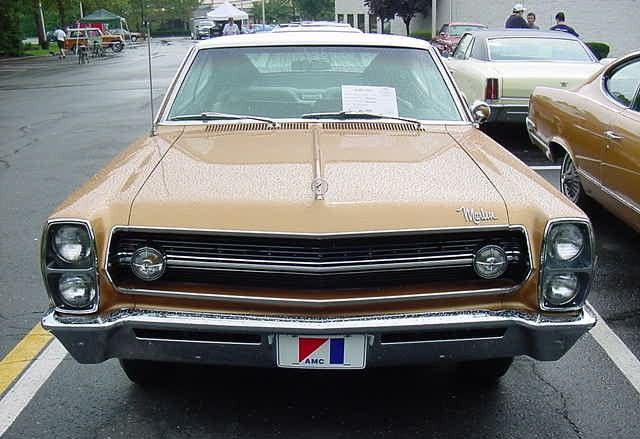
The front end was shared with the AMC Ambassador

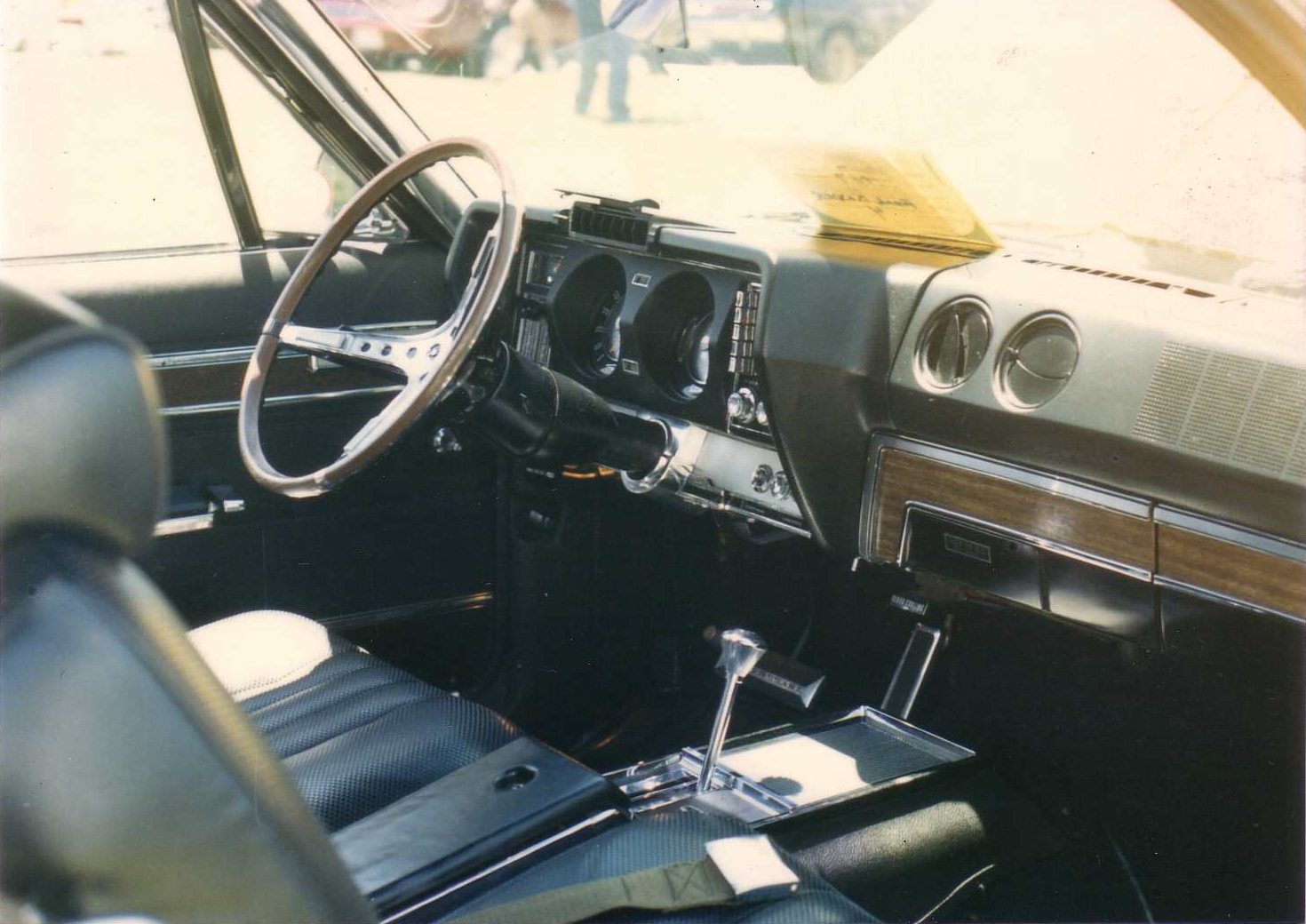
1967 luxury and safety oriented interior

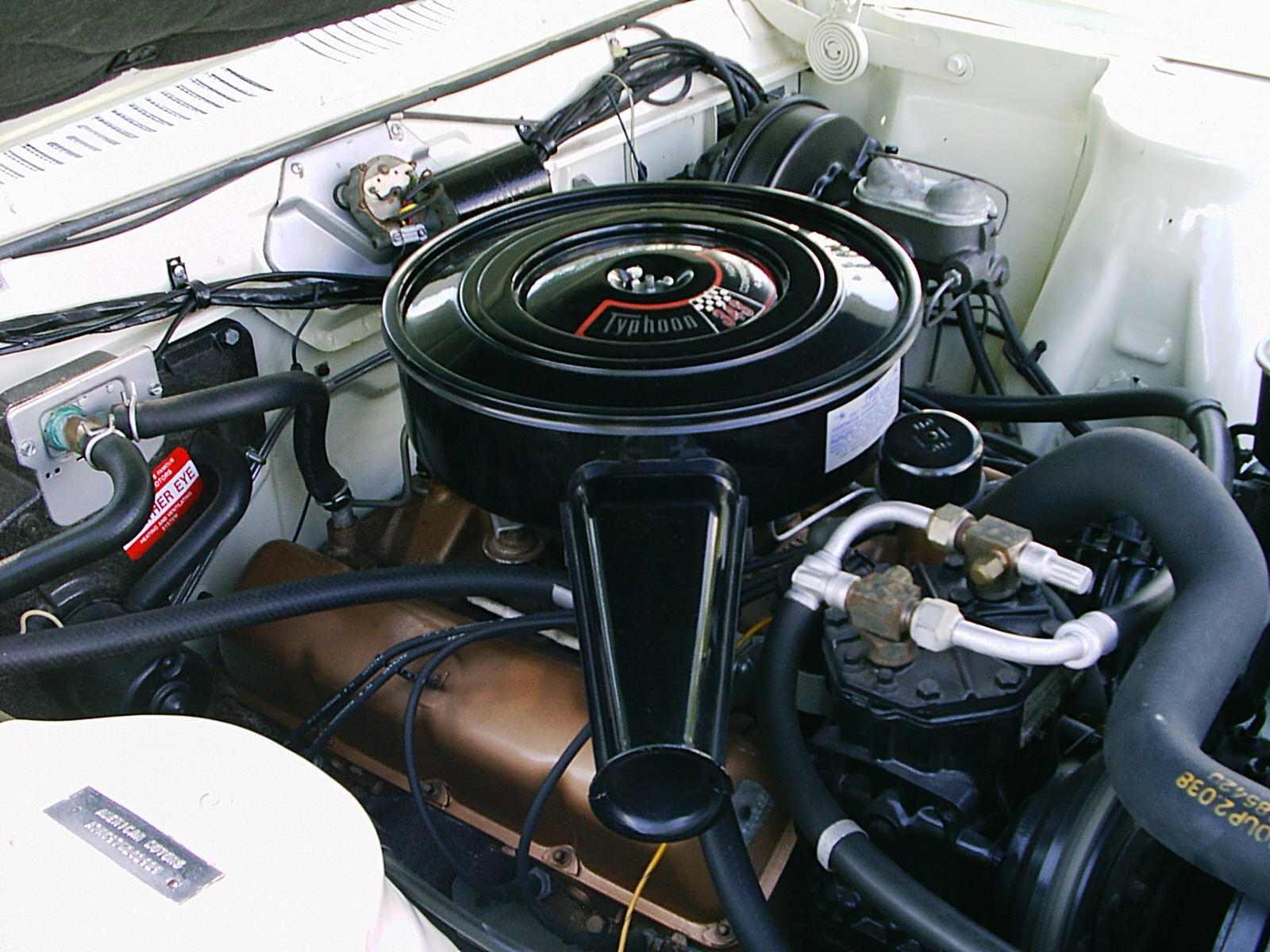
The all-new 343 "Typhoon" V8 engine

The 1967 model year saw an increase in specialty market segment that included "the luxurious personal cars, Thunderbird, Riviera, Marlin, Charger, Toronado and Eldorado." The Marlin was made larger and more expensive for the 1967 model year. It was now built on AMC's completely redesigned 118 in (2,997 mm) wheelbase "senior" platform, i.e. the AMC Ambassador chassis. The retooling for 1967 design changes that were mostly to the "senior" line of AMC cars (Ambassador, Marlin, Rebel) cost $35 million. (US$347,307,692 in 2025 dollars) The overall length of the new Marlin's body increased by 6.5 inches (165 mm) with more rear seat legroom, as well as being wider resulting in 2.2 inches (56 mm) of additional interior room, but in the process the car gained 350 pounds (159 kg) compared to the previous models.

Making the Marlin larger was a design requirement in anticipation of the 1968 entry of the compact-platform based Javelin. Also the longer, wider car would improve product differentiation among AMC's various model lines. Motor Trend magazine compared two "Sporty Specialties" – the 1967 AMC Marlin and Dodge Charger – concluded that both are "caught in the middle" because "neither has the compactness of the basic sports-personal archetypes such as the Mustang or Camaro, nor the posh elegance to social climb" of models such as the Cadillac Eldorado or Buick Riviera. Rather, "both aim at the driver who wants a sporty-type car, but who doesn’t want to give up room and comfort and isn’t ready to move into more expensive category." The 1967 Marlin was part of the "cool" car sales pie that featured sporty cars with "the popular fastback silhouette".

The Ambassador chassis allowed for a longer hood that harmonized better with its fastback rear end, and the body was given a less angular appearance. A bright trim strip from the door opening to the rear bumper accentuates the slightly kicked-up "coke bottle" profile of the rear fenders. The front end shared the Ambassador's vertically stacked headlights in slightly protruding nacelles, and an all-new recessed extruded aluminum grille with horizontal bars that bowed forward in the center. The grille was a black anodized version of the twin (parking and turn-signal) "rally light" grille on the Ambassador DPL models. The hood ornament was redesigned, with a small chrome marlin fish set in clear plastic inside a chrome ring.

The main feature was the Marlin's fastback roof with "stylish elliptical C-pillars that ended "between two stubby, squared-off fins" in the rear. The decklid was the same as on the previous model, but now without the large round insignia. A bigger back window improved rear visibility. New taillights were similar to those on the first-generation car. The rear bumper was slightly different from the one used on the Ambassador and Rebel station wagons, the top edge being a continuous horizontal line that fits up against the body.

Teague said the 1967 car was 'the best-looking Marlin we built.' Motor Trend magazine described the all-new styling of AMC's new full-size cars as "attractive" and "more graceful and easier on the eye in '67."

The second-generation Marlin did not have its own catalog, but was described within the large Ambassador sales brochure. The Ambassador's standard features and options also came on the Marlin. The interiors continued to offer premium materials and fittings, including wood-grain trim, and were the same as on the Ambassador 990 and DPL two-door hardtop models (with the exception of the "Custom" package that had two matching pillows) that "rival more expensive cars for luxury and quality, yet are durable enough to take years of normal wear." Many Marlins were ordered with the reclining buckets seats that not only featured a center armrest between them (with a center cushion for a third occupant or a floor console with gear selector), but also a foldaway center armrest for the rear seat. The interior design was new and featured a safety-oriented dashboard with the instruments and controls grouped in front of the driver, while the rest of the dash was pushed forward and away from the passengers. Protruding knobs and controls were eliminated from any area that the passenger or driver could strike them. The steering wheel was smaller than used before and the column was now designed to collapse under impact. A new lane change feature was made standard for the turn signal.

An entirely new family of V8 engines was offered. The six-cylinder was still available, but rarely ordered -only 355 were built. The base V8 was the 290 cu in (4.8 L) with a 2-barrel carburetor, while a pair of 343 cu in (5.6 L) V8s were optional: a 2-barrel that ran on regular-fuel, as well as a high-compression (10.2:1) premium-fuel version with a 4-barrel carburetor and dual exhaust that produced 280 hp (209 kW; 284 PS) at 4800 rpm and 365 pound-feet (495 N⋅m) of torque at 3000 rpm. An entirely new four-link, trailing-arm rear suspension system was introduced eliminating the previous torque tube design.

Motor Trend magazine's road test of the Marlin with the 343 engine reported zero to 60 mph in 9.6 seconds, and ran a 17.6-second quarter-mile at 82 mph (132 km/h) with two passengers aboard, which was comparable to the performance of a Dodge Charger with a 383 cu in (6.3 L). Fuel economy with the 280 hp V8 averaged 15.3 mpg_{‑US} (15.4 L/100 km; 18.4 mpg_{‑imp}) city and 17.6 mpg_{‑US} (13.4 L/100 km; 21.1 mpg_{‑imp}) highway, while with the 155 hp straight-six the big Marlin averaged 17.3 mpg_{‑US} (13.6 L/100 km; 20.8 mpg_{‑imp}) city and 20.4 mpg_{‑US} (11.5 L/100 km; 24.5 mpg_{‑imp}) highway. The Marlin "also handled well" and featured reclining seats that are "well worth the extra $44.65 to anyone who travels long distances."

Sales of the redesigned Marlin fell to 2,545. This was partly a result of customers' diminishing confidence in the financial health of the automaker under Abernethy's leadership, partly confusion caused by AMC's move away from its loyal "economy" customer market segments into segments dominated by the domestic "Big Three" (GM, Ford, and Chrysler), and partially a reflection of cannibalism of its potential market by the successful introduction of the Javelin. Buyers did not turn to the "family"-sized fastbacks including the Dodge Charger, which saw 1967 model sales drop by half compared to its prior 1966 introductory year. Both the AMC Marlin and the very similar looking first generation Dodge Charger "flopped on the market as sporty car buyers were showing their preference for compact pony cars." The Marlin ceased production at the end of the 1967 model year.

== Racing ==
The Marlin "was an overlooked performer on the muscle car landscape", yet it was campaigned without factory support in motorsport venues. Roy Abernethy was opposed to corporate sponsorship of activities that glamorized speed and performance, and had instituted a prohibition on automobile racing. While the Big Three automakers in the U.S. were focusing on high performance during the early 1960s, AMC ran advertising that said: "Why don't we enter high-performance Rambler V-8s in racing? Because the only race Rambler cares about is the human race." Nevertheless, the 1965 Marlin was an attempt to attract younger customers. The Marlin was promoted as an image-breaking model and AMC dealerships began sponsoring Ramblers in auto racing.

=== Dragstrip ===
Preston Honea achieved drag racing fame with the "Bill Kraft Rambler". The effort began in 1964 when the Bill Kraft Rambler dealership had installed a highly modified AMC Ambassador V8 engine (the 327 V8 bored out to 418 cu in (6.8 L), four carburetors, special intake manifold) in a 1964 Rambler that ran 112 mph (180 km/h) at the Fontana dragstrip. For the 1965 season, Kraft built a new "Bill Kraft Rambler", this time a fastback-bodied Marlin Funny Car on alcohol fuel and nitrous injection. The AMC engine was replaced by a Plymouth Hemi. On its first time out, the Hemi-powered car ran a 10.31-second quarter-mile at 138 mph (222 km/h).

=== Oval ===
Roy Haslam, a 1999 inductee to Victoria Auto Racing Hall of Fame, raced his AMC Marlin Super Stock (image) in Canada and the U.S. He won the July Cup and was 3rd in the season point championships.

=== Endurance ===
Brothers Larry and Don Hess raced a Marlin in the 1966 24 Hours of Daytona. Sponsored by Queen City Rambler, a Charlotte, North Carolina AMC dealership, the car ran almost stock, even with a radio antenna. The passenger seats were removed, a roll bar installed, and the factory exhaust system replaced with open headers that exited below the doors. The Marlin retired after 80 laps with overheating and steering problems, and was reportedly sold as a used car after the race.

== Special versions ==
American Motors designers and stylists made two operational show cars (Concept), The Black Marlin and The Tahiti Marlin. Both used the platform of the first generation Marlin and promoted Rambler's new emphasis on luxury and glamour.

- The Black Marlin toured the 1965 auto shows along with attractive young women in sailors' outfits. It was finished in black with "a sleek and stylish silver interior and a chrome roof." At the end of the 1965 tour it went back to the American Motors studios to be refit as the 1966 “Tahiti”
- The Tahiti luxury version toured the shows in 1966, starting with the North American International Auto Show in Detroit. It was finished in a brilliant fireflake blue metallic with "bright South Seas floral upholstery" accented with rhinestones and matching throw pillows.
- The Marlin II was design experiment in 1965 to mate a first-generation Marlin with the front end of the Ambassador. Advance product reports by Popular Mechanics indicated that the existing Marlin would remain, but a longer, Ambassador-wheelbase version would be added for the 1966 model year. Popular Science also noted that AMC was working on a larger fastback, as well as a 106 compact, Tarpon-like fastback model. The Marlin II essentially foretold the switch to the longer wheelbase platform that occurred later for the 1967 model year. The actual Marlin II design car was used by Richard Teague, and was sold in 1967.
- The Prototype was a version made to showcase the 1967 model. It was now built on AMC's completely redesigned 118-inch wheelbase "senior" platform, i.e. the AMC Ambassador chassis. This handmade car featured a few unique details, such as arm rests made of plaster and a 4-speed manual transmission with cruise control. This car was used in 1967 show room literature before being sent to AMC’s proving grounds to be used as a push mule.
- George Barris customized a 1966 Rambler Marlin for Rader, a wheel manufacturer, to use for promotion. The car was repainted Candy Red with powdered gold leaf in the clear coat, and had Rader wheels with "thick wall" tires, a reworked mesh grille with four rectangular Cibié headlamps, and Black Pearl Naugahyde on the trunk. Later Barris worked with AMC to produce dealer-installed customizing kits for the AMX.
- The roof was cut off a 1966 Marlin for the Florida Marlins, a professional baseball team based in Miami Gardens, Florida. With no seats except for the driver, the car was used in parades and on-field ceremonies at Pro Player Stadium and transported the team's mascot "Billy the Marlin" for the fans to see during the ball club's 1997 world championship season.

== Legacy ==
=== New market segments ===
In spite of there being "many who welcomed the new breed of mid-size fastbacks as a breath of fresh air", the intermediate-size fastback car was not a big hit in the marketplace. However, According to Consumer Reports, these cars defied "the usual guidelines to size and price class, and they cannot be measured against any standard".

The Marlin had low sales overall but generated publicity and excitement, attracting potential customers to AMC dealers not only for it but other models. It also added a positive contribution margin to the company's sales, with first-year sales helping generate a profit of US$5.2 million (US$53,125,660 in 2025 dollars) for AMC in fiscal 1965, despite a three-week strike by the United Auto Workers.

The mid-sixties automobile market in the U.S. was marked an increasing influence of younger buyers who wanted a sporty image. Most of the "sportiness" of these was due to effective marketing. No longer satisfied with "standard" cars the market moved into new segments that included pony cars, muscle cars, and personal luxury cars. Many were heavily restyled derivatives of volume models and shared common parts. Moreover, they were image builders and big profit generators for their automakers. The objective of the Marlin was to move AMC in this direction. However, the AMC "had an established image as an expert in the small-car field", and thus faced problems in marketing the Marlin as a sporty big car. Moreover, "the Marlin actually represented a double leap" for AMC: into performance, as well as personalization. The model had a good start, but sales quickly bottomed out in the 1967 model year. The automaker's anti-racing philosophy turned around after $40 million (US$396,923,077 in 2025 dollars) was spent to develop a new V8 engine family and AMC turned to "competitive events as a means of knocking down its avidly gathered reputation for economy."

Although the Marlin was discontinued in 1967, it paved the way for a successful replacement—the 1968 AMC Javelin, a true Pony car. Therefore, the Marlin's introduction in 1965 can be viewed as stopgap marketing move by AMC, influenced by the company's lack of a V8 engine at that time to fit the compact Rambler chassis. As a mid-sized car, the Marlin was not a dashing, affordable pony car, and after three years of production, it would "step aside in favor of another two-door: the hip, new Javelin."

=== In 2002 Romney campaign ===
The Marlin was the subject of political controversy in Republican candidate Mitt Romney's 2002 Massachusetts gubernatorial election campaign.

In a television advertisement Romney and his wife Ann tenderly describe their first date and falling in love. Mrs. Romney recalls her husband pulling up in "some goofy-looking car" and running out of gas on the way home. Romney describes being embarrassed by the fact that in high school he drove a car that he says was "kinda awful."

What Romney did not say in the ads was that the car was a brand new Marlin, from the company that was headed by his father, George W. Romney, from 1954 to 1962.

The rival Shannon O'Brien campaign responded that Romney "actually drove a cool car"—a "personal luxury car" according to AutoWeek magazine. The press release by the Democratic ticket chided: "...the fact that Mitt Romney was embarrassed by his brand new car shows just how out of touch with regular working people he is."

=== Crossfire similarity ===
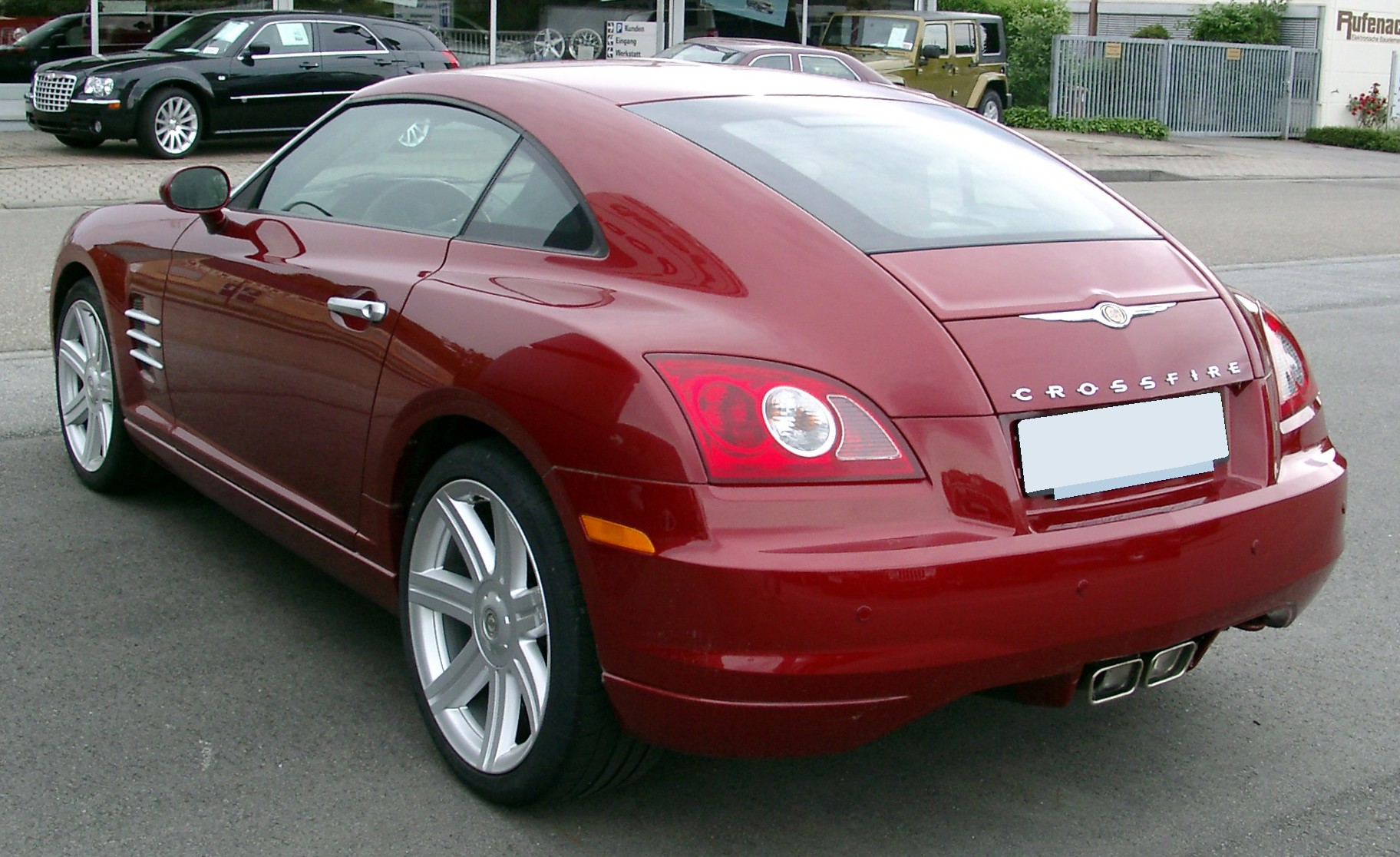
Some saw a resemblance in the Crossfire's roof, rear fenders, and rear end design to the Marlin's

Some of the main design components of the Marlin's design returned in 2004 with the Chrysler Crossfire fastback coupé. The rear-wheel drive, two-seat sports car was developed when Chrysler was merged with German automaker Daimler-Benz (forming DaimlerChrysler) and shared most of its components with the Mercedes-Benz SLK320. The original concept car was styled by Eric Stoddard, the car was further refined by Andrew Dyson and built by the German coachbuilder Karmann. Both the Marlin and Crossfire became "known more for their rear view than their front styling."

The new coupé displayed a fastback roofline with broad rear fenders, a rear end treatment that prompted many automotive journalists to comment on the Crossfire's resemblance to the AMC Marlin. Examples include automotive journalist Rob Rothwell, who wrote "...when I first espied the rear lines of the Chrysler Crossfire I was instantly transported back to 1965 and my favorite car of that year, the Rambler Marlin." Automotive editor to The Detroit News described the "distinctive boat-tail rear end that reminds more than one observer of the old Rambler Marlin." Motor Trend also compared the "provocative boattail theme" of the 2004 Crossfire's sheetmetal to that of the AMC Marlin. Even the handling characteristics of the Crossfire were compared by one British journalist to "a detuned 1967 AMC Marlin with locked-solid suspension."

=== Scale models ===
A highly detailed Marlin promotional 1/25-scale model was manufactured under license from AMC by Jo-Han for the 1965 and 1966 model years. The only differences are their grilles and removal of the Rambler name on the 1966s. A friction model was also available from Jo-Han in 1966. Although available in a variety of single and two-tone color combinations, many of these "dealer promos" were done in aqua/dark blue two-tone plastic. Unwanted by AMC dealers as the 1966 model year neared its end, thousands of the models were given away to institutions such as children's hospitals and orphan's homes. They are now highly desirable and they command premium prices. Their value can be upwards of $200 to 400 for mint, in-the-box specimens that still have the hood ornament.

Jo-Han also produced 1/25-scale plastic kits of the 1966 Marlin (Jo-Han C1900), and reissued it in the mid-1970s in the "U.S.A. Oldies" series (Jo-Han C-3666). They are based on the promotional models, but are less valuable today. According to Steve Magnante of Hot Rod magazine, Jo-Han appears to be poised for a comeback with its most famous unassembled model kits favoring offbeat subjects, "but save up-this stuff is pricey."

Two types of die-cast toy models were sold under the Corgi Toy brand and manufactured by Mettoy Playcraft in the UK during the late 1960s. Both were done in 1:48 scale. One was a two-tone red and black Marlin with opening doors and a tow hook. The "Rambler Marlin Sports Fastback" (Corgi 263) scale model was released in 1966 and withdrawn from the market in 1969. In addition to the two-tone paint with chrome bumpers and grille, the model features a detailed interior finished in white and the front seat backs can be tipped forward (as in the actual cars). The second was a gift boxed set (Corgi GS10) with the Marlin finished in blue with a white roof and featuring a roof rack for a kayak, as well as towing a matching utility trailer with opening hatches. Released in 1968, this set had a short run of just 11 months.
