= USS Marlin =

USS Marlin may refer to:

- USS Marlin (SS-205), a Mackerel-class submarine launched 29 January 1941 and sold for scrapping 29 March 1946
- USS Marlin (SST-2), launched 14 October 1953 and donated for a museum ship in 1973, residing in Omaha, Nebraska
