= Marlín =

- municipality
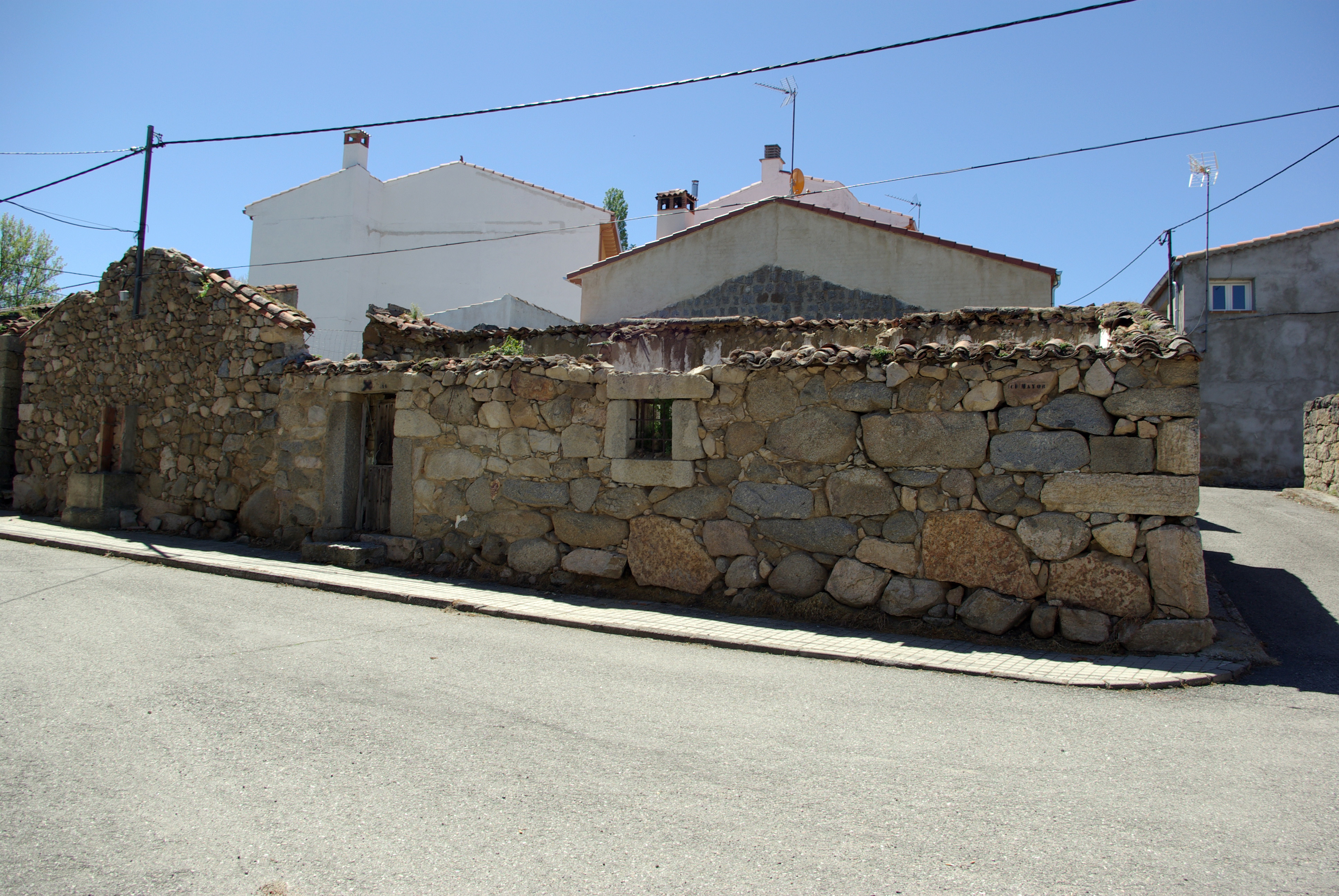
- Street of Marlín

- Location in Spain. Marlín (Spain)
- Coordinates: 40°42′41″N 4°49′47″W
- Country: Spain
- Autonomous community: Castile and León
- Province: Ávila

Area
  - Total: 6.39 km^{2} (2.47 sq mi)
- Elevation: 1,203 m (3,947 ft)

Population (2025-01-01)
  - Total: 29
  - Density: 4.5/km^{2} (12/sq mi)
- Time zone: UTC+1 (CET)
  - Summer (DST): UTC+2 (CEST)
- Website: Official website

Marlín is a village and municipality located in the province of Ávila, part of the autonomous community of Castile-Leon, Spain.

== Population ==
Historical population
Year	Pop.	±% p.a.
2023	34	—
2024	31	−8.82%
2025	29	−6.45%
Source: INE
