= Marine Life Information Network =

The Marine Life Information Network (MarLIN) is an information system for marine biodiversity for Great Britain and Ireland.

MarLIN was established in 1998 by the Marine Biological Association together with the environmental protection agencies and academic institutions in Britain and Ireland.

The MarLIN data access programme has now become the DASSH Marine Data Archive Cantre. DASSH is built on the existing extensive data and dissemination skills of the Marine Life Information Network (MarLIN), the library and information services of the National Marine Biological Library (NMBL) and the MBA's historical role in marine science.
