= Marling (surname) =

Marling is a surname. Notable people with the surname include:

- Alfred Erskine Marling (1859–1935), President of the Chamber of Commerce of the State of New York
- Brit Marling (born 1983), American actress, screenwriter and film producer
- Charles Murray Marling (1863–1933), British diplomat
- Laura Marling (born 1990), British singer
- Percival Marling (1861–1936), British recipient of the Victoria Cross
- Robert E. Marling, Jr., American banker
- Samuel Marling (1810–1883), British cloth manufacturer
