= Eric Stoddard =

Eric Stoddard (born 24 June 1975), is an automobile and industrial designer who has worked for DaimlerChrysler and Hyundai Kia Automotive Group.

== DaimlerChrysler ==
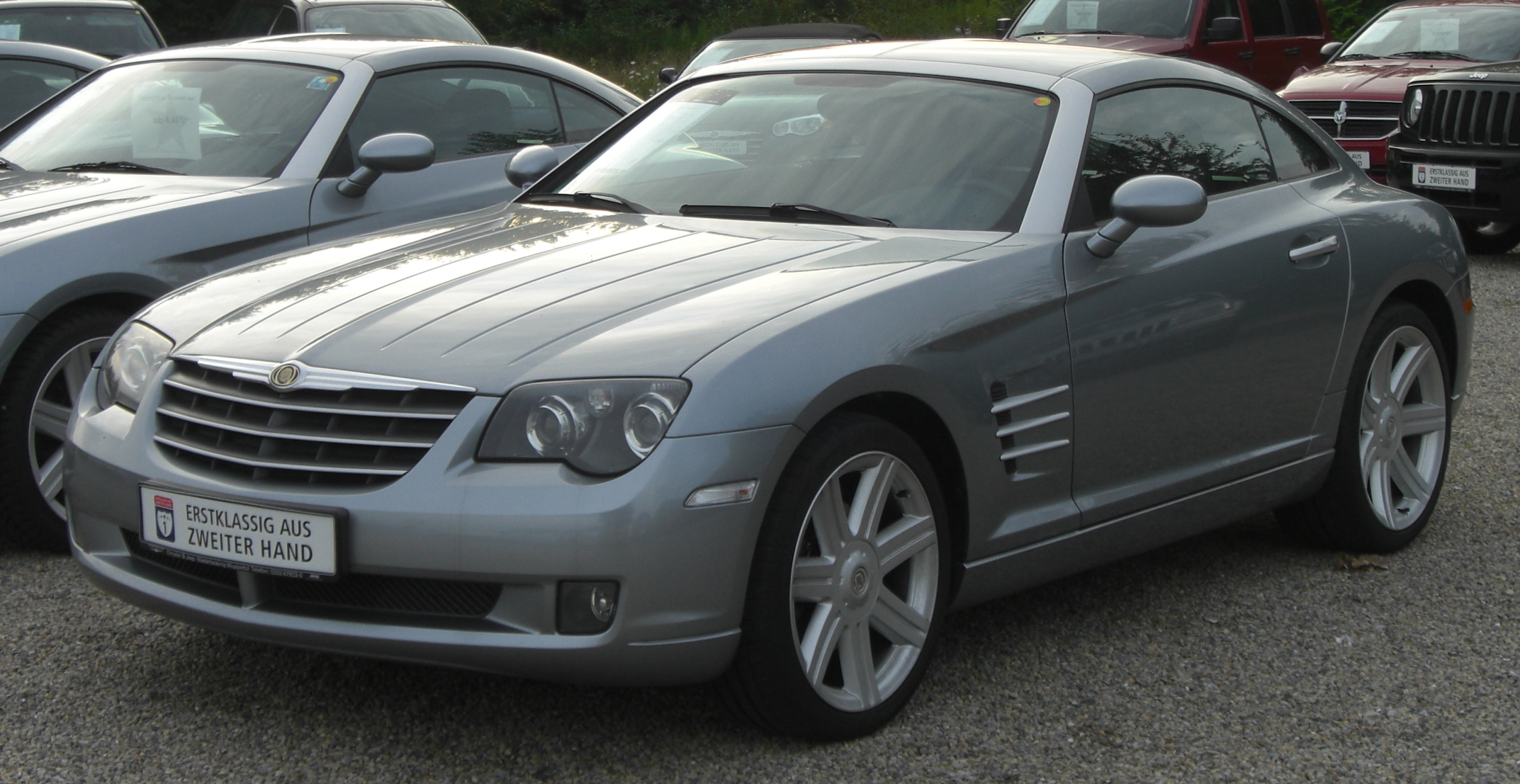
Chrysler Crossfire

While at the Chrysler Headquarters and Technology Center in Auburn Hills, Michigan, Stoddard worked under Don Renkert to design the Chrysler Crossfire Concept released at the North American International Auto Show in 2001. Stoddard went on to become the lead exterior designer of the production model of the Chrysler Crossfire under Andrew Dyson.

Stoddard was also the lead exterior designer on the Dodge SRT-4 as well as a contributing designer to the Chrysler Pacifica, 2003 Dodge Viper and Chrysler Sebring.

== Hyundai ==
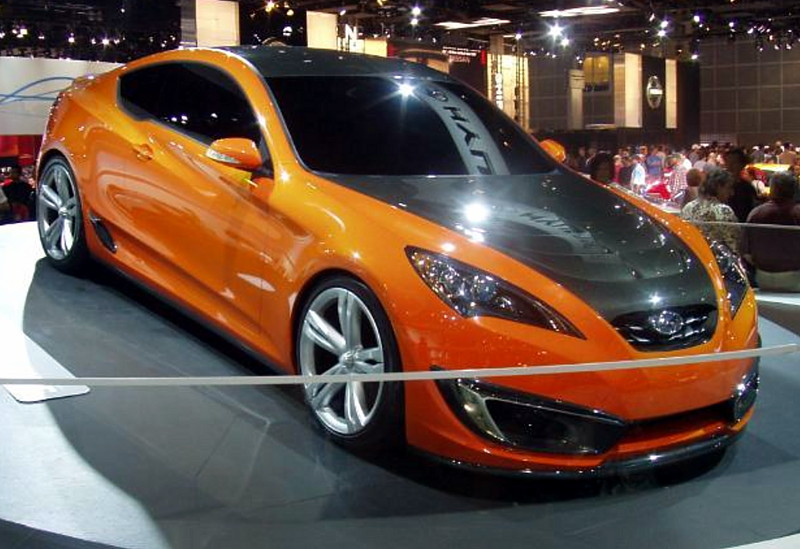
Hyundai Genesis Coupe concept

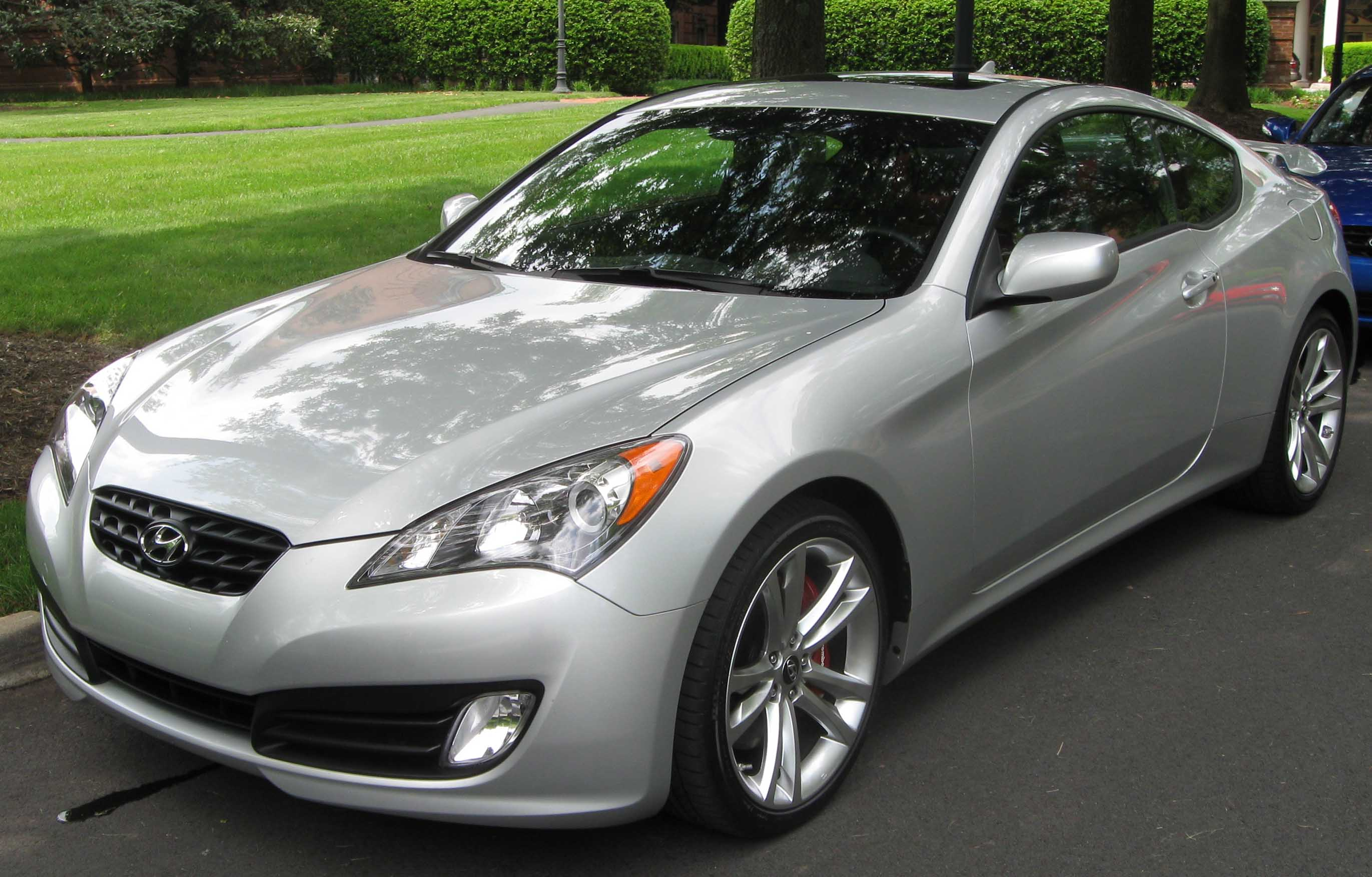
Hyundai Genesis Coupe

In 2002, Stoddard was recruited as a senior designer to Hyundai Kia Automotive Group in Irvine, California. At Hyundai, under Design Chief Joel Piaskowski, Stoddard lead the exterior design of the Hyundai Genesis Coupe Concept unveiled at the 2007 LA Auto Show, the Production 2010 Hyundai Genesis Coupe, the HCD-9 Talus Concept, the 2007 Hyundai Elantra and KCD-1 Slice Concept.

== Awards ==
Stoddard received of a Red Dot Design Award in 2009 for a bicycle design concept called the Zoomla and was a finalist for the 2010 Taipei Cycle Show for his bicycle entry the AutoVelo.
