= Marlin Eller =

American programmer

- Occupation: Programmer
- Known for: Development at Microsoft, authoring Barbarians Led by Bill Gates

Marlin Eller is an American programmer who was a manager and a software developer at Microsoft Corporation from 1982 to 1995, and he was development lead for the Graphics Device Interface of Windows 1.0 and also for Pen Windows. He was also a co-founder and the CEO of Sunhawk Digital Music LLC. He was later chairman of the game development company Reflexive Entertainment.

Eller also co-authored the book Barbarians Led by Bill Gates with Jennifer Edstrom.

Eller received his Bachelor of Arts in mathematics from Whitman College in 1974. He then went on for his Master of Science in mathematics from the University of Washington.

== See also ==
- Pen computing

== Bibliography ==
- 1995 Multiple-Scattering Calculations of X-Ray Absorption Spectra, The American Physical Society
- 1998 Barbarians Led by Bill Gates, co-authored with Jennifer Edstrom, Henry Holt, Inc., 256 pp., ISBN 0-8050-5754-4
