= John Marlin =

John Marlin may refer to:

- John Mahlon Marlin, New England armorer and gunsmith
- John Marlin (Texas settler), Texian patriot and namesake of Marlin, Texas
