= History of bitcoin =

Number of on-chain bitcoin transactions per month (logarithmic scale)

Bitcoin is a cryptocurrency, a digital asset that uses cryptography to control its creation and management rather than relying on central authorities. Originally designed as a medium of exchange, Bitcoin is now primarily regarded as a store of value. The history of bitcoin started with its invention and implementation by Satoshi Nakamoto, who integrated many existing ideas from the cryptography community. Over the course of bitcoin's history, it has undergone rapid growth to become a significant store of value both on- and offline. From the mid-2010s, some businesses began accepting bitcoin in addition to traditional currencies.

== Background ==
Prior to the release of bitcoin, there were a number of digital cash technologies, starting with the issuer-based ecash protocols of David Chaum and Stefan Brands. The idea that solutions to computational puzzles could have some value was first proposed by cryptographers Cynthia Dwork and Moni Naor in 1992.

=== Adam Back ===
The idea was independently rediscovered by Adam Back who developed hashcash, a proof-of-work scheme for spam control in 1997. The first proposals for distributed digital scarcity-based cryptocurrencies were Wei Dai's b-money and Nick Szabo's bit gold. Hal Finney developed reusable proof of work (RPOW) using hashcash as proof of work algorithm. In the bit gold proposal which proposed a collectible market-based mechanism for inflation control, Nick Szabo also investigated some additional aspects including a Byzantine fault-tolerant agreement protocol based on quorum addresses to store and transfer the chained proof-of-work solutions, which was vulnerable to Sybil attacks, though.

== Creation and launch, 2008–2009 ==
On 18 August 2008, the domain name bitcoin.org was registered. Later that year, on 31 October, a link to a paper authored by Satoshi Nakamoto titled Bitcoin: A Peer-to-Peer Electronic Cash System was posted to a cryptography mailing list. This paper detailed methods of using a peer-to-peer network to generate what was described as "a system for electronic transactions without relying on trust". On 3 January 2009, the bitcoin network came into existence with Satoshi Nakamoto mining the genesis block of bitcoin (block number 0), which had a reward of 50 bitcoins. Embedded in the genesis block was the text: "The Times 03/Jan/2009 Chancellor on brink of second bailout for banks." The text refers to a headline in The Times published on 3 January 2009. This note has been interpreted as both a timestamp of the genesis date and a derisive comment on the instability caused by fractional-reserve banking.

The first open source bitcoin client was released on 9 January 2009, hosted at SourceForge. One of the first supporters, adopters, contributors to bitcoin and receiver of the first bitcoin transaction was programmer Hal Finney. Finney downloaded the bitcoin software the day it was released, and received 10 bitcoins from Nakamoto in the world's first bitcoin transaction on 12 January 2009 (block 170). Other early supporters were Wei Dai, creator of bitcoin predecessor b-money, and Nick Szabo, creator of bitcoin predecessor bit gold. One of the first miners included James Howells, who subsequently lost thousands of Bitcoin to a landfill in Newport.

Before disappearing from any involvement in bitcoin, Nakamoto in a sense handed over the reins to developer Gavin Andresen, who then became the bitcoin lead developer at the Bitcoin Foundation, the "anarchic" bitcoin community's closest thing to an official public face.

=== Satoshi Nakamoto ===
"Satoshi Nakamoto" is presumed to be a pseudonym for the person or people who designed the original bitcoin protocol in 2007 then released the whitepaper in 2008 and finally launched the network in 2009. Nakamoto was responsible for creating the majority of the official bitcoin software and was active in making modifications and posting technical information on the bitcoin forum. There has been much speculation as to the identity of Satoshi Nakamoto and their real identity remains a matter of dispute.

== Early adoption and infrastructure, 2010–2012 ==
=== 2010 ===
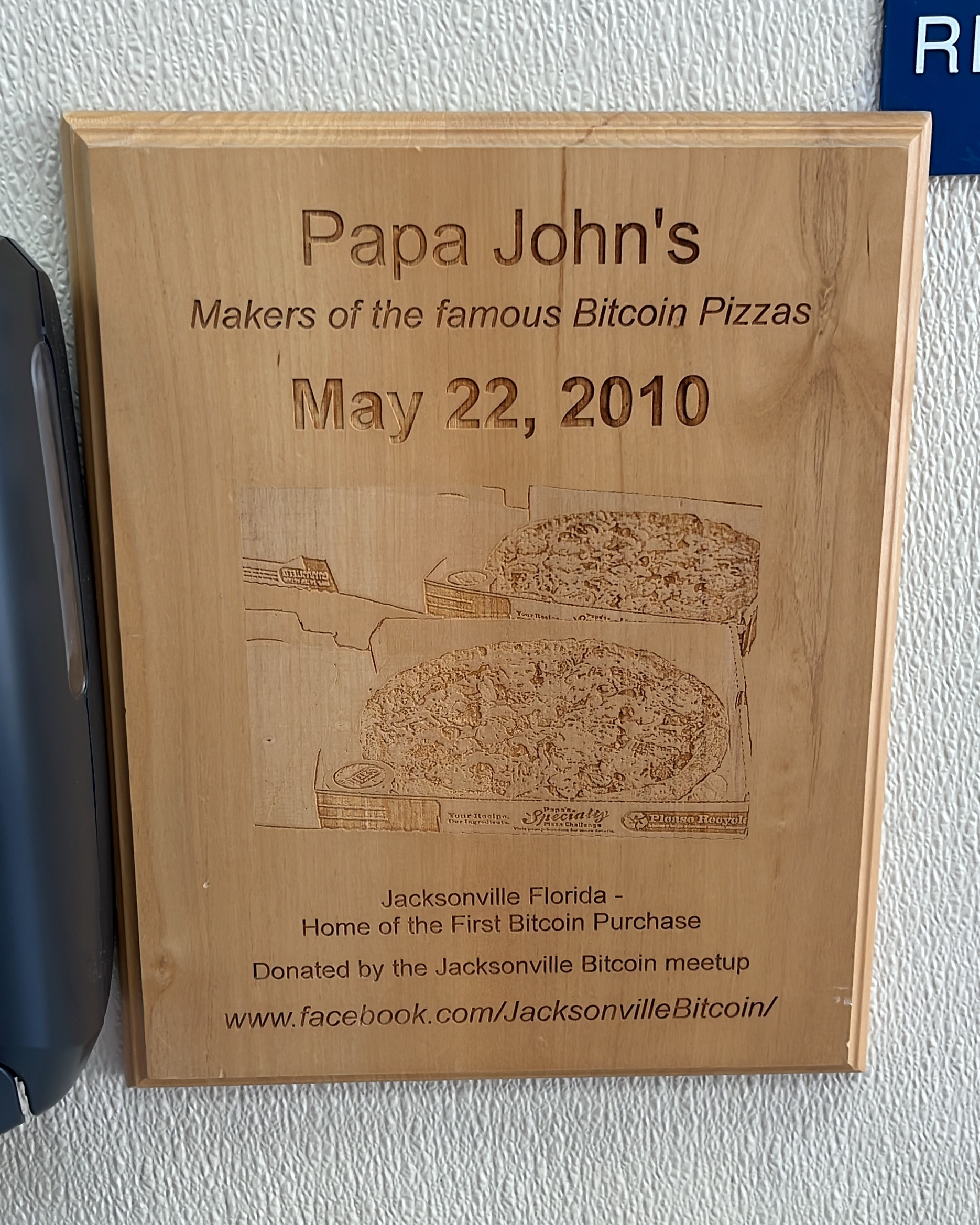
The plaque at the Papa John's franchise on Atlantic Blvd in Jacksonville, Florida, where two pizzas were made and delivered from for the first notable retail bitcoin transaction.

The first notable retail transaction involving physical goods took place on 22 May 2010. Laszlo Hanyecz, a programmer in Jacksonville, Florida, posted on the Bitcointalk forum offering 10,000 of his mined bitcoins in exchange for two pizzas. A 19-year-old in California named Jeremy Sturdivant accepted the offer and ordered two Papa John's pizzas for delivery to Hanyecz's home, receiving the 10,000 BTC in exchange. At the time, the bitcoins were worth around $41. The date is commemorated annually as "Bitcoin Pizza Day".

On 6 August 2010, a major vulnerability in the bitcoin protocol was spotted. While the protocol did verify that a transaction's outputs never exceeded its inputs, a transaction whose outputs summed to more than $2^{64}$ would overflow, permitting the transaction author to create arbitrary amounts of bitcoin. On 15 August, the vulnerability was exploited; a single transaction spent 0.5 bitcoin to send just over 92 billion bitcoins ($2^{63}$ satoshis) to each of two different addresses on the network. Within hours, the transaction was spotted, the bug was fixed, and the blockchain was forked by miners using an updated version of the bitcoin protocol. Since the blockchain was forked below the problematic transaction, the transaction no longer appears in the blockchain used by the current Bitcoin network.

=== 2011 ===
Based on bitcoin's open-source code, other cryptocurrencies started to emerge. The Electronic Frontier Foundation, a non-profit group, started accepting bitcoins in January 2011, then stopped accepting them in June 2011, citing concerns about a lack of legal precedent about new currency systems. The EFF's decision was reversed on 17 May 2013 when they resumed accepting bitcoin. In May 2011, bitcoin payment processor, BitPay was founded to provide mobile checkout services to companies wanting to accept bitcoins as a form of payment. In June 2011, WikiLeaks and other organizations began to accept bitcoins for donations.

=== 2012 ===
In January 2012, bitcoin was featured as the main subject within a fictionalized trial on the CBS legal drama The Good Wife in the third-season episode "Bitcoin for Dummies". The host of CNBC's Mad Money, Jim Cramer, played himself in a courtroom scene where he testifies that he does not consider bitcoin a true currency, saying, "There's no central bank to regulate it; it's digital and functions completely peer to peer". In September 2012, the Bitcoin Foundation was launched to "accelerate the global growth of bitcoin through standardization, protection, and promotion of the open source protocol". The founders were Gavin Andresen, Jon Matonis, Mark Karpelès, Charlie Shrem, and Peter Vessenes. In October 2012, BitPay reported having over 1,000 merchants accepting bitcoin under its payment processing service. In November 2012, WordPress started accepting bitcoins.

== Expansion, regulation, and major exchange incidents, 2013–2016 ==
=== 2013 ===
In February 2013, the exchange Coinbase reported selling US$1 million worth of bitcoins in a single month at over $22 per bitcoin. The Internet Archive announced that it was ready to accept donations as bitcoins and that it intends to give employees the option to receive portions of their salaries in bitcoin currency. In Charles Stross's 2013 science fiction novel Neptune's Brood, the universal interstellar payment system is known as "bitcoin" and operates using cryptography. Stross later blogged that the reference was intentional, saying "I wrote Neptune's Brood in 2011. Bitcoin was obscure back then, and I figured had just enough name recognition to be a useful term for an interstellar currency: it'd clue people in that it was a networked digital currency."

In March 2013, an incompatibility between versions 0.7 and 0.8.0 caused a temporary split in the blockchain; normal operation resumed after most miners downgraded to version 0.7. In the US, the Financial Crimes Enforcement Network (FinCEN) established regulatory guidelines for "decentralized virtual currencies" such as bitcoin, classifying American bitcoin miners who sell their generated bitcoins as Money Service Businesses (or MSBs), that may be subject to registration and other legal obligations.

In April, payment processors BitInstant and Mt. Gox experienced processing delays due to insufficient capacity, contributing to sharp price volatility. Bitcoin gained greater recognition when services such as OkCupid and Foodler began accepting it for payment. In April 2013, Eric Posner, a law professor at the University of Chicago, stated that "a real Ponzi scheme takes fraud; bitcoin, by contrast, seems more like a collective delusion."

On 15 May 2013, the US authorities seized accounts associated with Mt. Gox after discovering that it had not registered as a money transmitter with FinCEN in the US. On 17 May 2013, it was reported that BitInstant processed approximately 30 percent of the money going into and out of bitcoin, and in April alone facilitated 30,000 transactions, On 23 June 2013, it was reported that the US Drug Enforcement Administration listed 11.02 bitcoins as a seized asset in a United States Department of Justice seizure notice pursuant to 21 U.S.C. § 881. This was the first time a government agency was reported to have seized bitcoin. In July 2013, a project began in Kenya linking bitcoin with M-Pesa, a popular mobile payments system, in an experiment designed to spur innovative payments in Africa. During the same month the Foreign Exchange Administration and Policy Department in Thailand stated that bitcoin lacks any legal framework and would therefore be illegal, which effectively banned trading on bitcoin exchanges in the country.

On 6 August 2013, Federal Judge Amos Mazzant of the Eastern District of Texas of the Fifth Circuit ruled that bitcoins are "a currency or a form of money" (specifically securities as defined by Federal Securities Laws), and as such were subject to the court's jurisdiction, and Germany's Finance Ministry subsumed bitcoins under the term "unit of account" – a financial instrument – though not as e-money or a functional currency, a classification nonetheless having legal and tax implications. In October 2013, the FBI seized roughly 26,000 BTC from website Silk Road during the arrest of alleged owner Ross William Ulbricht. Two companies, Robocoin and Bitcoiniacs launched the world's first bitcoin ATM on 29 October 2013 in Vancouver, BC, Canada, allowing clients to sell or purchase bitcoin currency at a downtown coffee shop. Chinese internet giant Baidu had allowed clients of website security services to pay with bitcoins.

In November 2013, the University of Nicosia announced that it would be accepting bitcoin as payment for tuition fees. During November 2013, the China-based bitcoin exchange BTC China overtook the Japan-based Mt. Gox and the Europe-based Bitstamp to become the largest bitcoin trading exchange by trade volume. In December 2013, Overstock.com announced plans to accept bitcoin in the second half of 2014. On 5 December 2013, the People's Bank of China prohibited Chinese financial institutions from using bitcoins. After the announcement, the value of bitcoins dropped, and Baidu no longer accepted bitcoins for certain services. Buying real-world goods with any virtual currency had been illegal in China since at least 2009. On 4 December 2013, Alan Greenspan referred to it as a "bubble".

=== 2014 ===
In January 2014, Zynga announced it was testing bitcoin for purchasing in-game assets in seven of its games. That same month, The D Las Vegas Casino Hotel and Golden Gate Hotel & Casino properties in downtown Las Vegas announced they would also begin accepting bitcoin, according to an article by USA Today. The article also stated the currency would be accepted in five locations, including the front desk and certain restaurants. The network rate exceeded 10 petahash/sec. TigerDirect and Overstock.com started accepting bitcoin. The same month, an operator of a U.S. bitcoin exchange, Robert Faiella better known as Charlie Shrem, was arrested for money laundering.

In early February 2014, one of the largest bitcoin exchanges, Mt. Gox, suspended withdrawals citing technical issues. By the end of the month, Mt. Gox had filed for bankruptcy protection in Japan amid reports that 744,000 bitcoins had been stolen. Months before the filing, the popularity of Mt. Gox had waned as users experienced difficulties withdrawing funds. In June 2014, the network exceeded 100 petahash/sec. On 18 June 2014, it was announced that bitcoin payment service provider BitPay would become the new sponsor of St. Petersburg Bowl under a two-year deal, renamed the Bitcoin St. Petersburg Bowl. Bitcoin was to be accepted for ticket and concession sales at the game as part of the sponsorship, and the sponsorship itself was also paid for using bitcoin.

In July 2014, Newegg and Dell started accepting bitcoin. In September 2014, TeraExchange, LLC, received approval from the U.S. Commodity Futures Trading Commission "CFTC" to begin listing an over-the-counter swap product based on the price of a bitcoin. The CFTC swap product approval marks the first time a U.S. regulatory agency approved a bitcoin financial product. In December 2014, Microsoft began to accept bitcoin to buy Xbox games and Windows software. In 2014, several light-hearted songs celebrating bitcoin such as the "Ode to Satoshi" were released. A documentary film, The Rise and Rise of Bitcoin, was released in 2014, featuring interviews with bitcoin users such as a computer programmer and a drug dealer. On 13 March 2014, Warren Buffett called bitcoin a "mirage".

=== 2015 ===
In January 2015, Coinbase raised US$75 million as part of a Series C funding round, smashing the previous record for a bitcoin company. Less than one year after the collapse of Mt. Gox, United Kingdom-based exchange Bitstamp announced that their exchange would be taken offline while they investigate a hack which resulted in about 19,000 bitcoins (equivalent to roughly US$5 million at that time) being stolen from their hot wallet. The exchange remained offline for several days amid speculation that customers had lost their funds. Bitstamp resumed trading on 9 January after increasing security measures and assuring customers that their account balances would not be impacted.

In February 2015, the number of merchants accepting bitcoin exceeded 100,000. In 2015, the MAK (Museum of Applied Arts, Vienna) became the first museum to acquire art using bitcoin, when it purchased the screensaver "Event listeners" of van den Dorpel. In September 2015, the establishment of the peer-reviewed academic journal Ledger (ISSN 2379-5980) was announced. It covers studies of cryptocurrencies and related technologies, and is published by the University of Pittsburgh. In October 2015, a proposal was submitted to the Unicode Consortium to add a code point for the bitcoin symbol.

=== 2016 ===
In January 2016, the network rate exceeded 1 exahash/sec. In March 2016, the Cabinet of Japan recognized virtual currencies like bitcoin as having a function similar to real money. In July 2016, the CheckSequenceVerify soft fork activated. In August 2016, a major bitcoin exchange, Bitfinex, was hacked and nearly 120,000 BTC (around $60m) was stolen.

== Market boom, crash, and institutional adoption, 2017–2020 ==
=== 2017 ===
In January 2017, NHK reported the number of online stores accepting bitcoin in Japan had increased 4.6 times over the past year. In April, Japan passes a law to accept bitcoin as a legal payment method. Russia announces that it will legalize the use of cryptocurrencies such as bitcoin. In June 2017, the bitcoin symbol was encoded in Unicode version 10.0 at position U+20BF (₿) in the Currency Symbols block. On 1 August 2017, a hard fork created Bitcoin Cash from the Bitcoin blockchain. On 6 December 2017, the software marketplace Steam announced that it would no longer accept bitcoin as payment for its products, citing slow transactions speeds, price volatility, and high fees for transactions.

=== 2018 ===
On 22 January 2018, South Korea brought in a regulation that requires all the bitcoin traders to reveal their identity, thus putting a ban on anonymous trading of bitcoins. On 24 January 2018, the online payment firm Stripe announced that it would phase out its support for bitcoin payments by late April 2018, citing declining demand, rising fees and longer transaction times as the reasons. On 25 January 2018, George Soros referred to bitcoin as a bubble. In May 2018, the United States Department of Justice investigated bitcoin traders for possible price manipulation, focusing on practices like spoofing and wash trades. The investigation, which involved key exchanges like Bitstamp, Coinbase, and Kraken, led to subpoenas from the Commodity Futures Trading Commission after these exchanges failed to comply with information requests. In October 2018, Nelson Saiers installed a 9-foot inflatable rat covered with bitcoin references and code in front of the Federal Reserve as a homage to Satoshi Nakamoto and protests in New York City.

=== 2020 ===
On 2 July 2020, the Swiss company 21Shares started to quote a set of bitcoin exchange-traded products (ETP) on the Xetra trading system of the Deutsche Boerse. On 1 September 2020, the Wiener Börse listed its first 21 titles denominated in cryptocurrencies like bitcoin, including the services of real-time quotation and securities settlement. On 3 September 2020, the Frankfurt Stock Exchange admitted in its Regulated Market the quotation of the first bitcoin exchange-traded note (ETN), centrally cleared via Eurex Clearing. In October 2020, PayPal announced that it would allow its users to buy and sell bitcoin on its platform, although not to deposit or withdraw bitcoins.

== Corporate investment, legal-tender adoption, and market decline, 2021–2022 ==
=== 2021 ===
On 19 January 2021, Elon Musk placed the handle #Bitcoin in his Twitter profile, tweeting "In retrospect, it was inevitable", which caused the price to briefly rise about $5,000 in an hour to $37,299. On 25 January 2021, Microstrategy announced that it continued to buy bitcoin and as of the same date it had holdings of ₿70,784 worth $2.38 billion. On 8 February 2021 Tesla's announcement of a bitcoin purchase of US$1.5 billion and the plan to start accepting bitcoin as payment for vehicles, pushed the bitcoin price to $44,141. On 18 February 2021, Elon Musk stated that "owning bitcoin was only a little better than holding conventional cash, but that the slight difference made it a better asset to hold". After 49 days of accepting the digital currency, Tesla reversed course on 12 May 2021, saying they would no longer take bitcoin due to concerns that "mining" the cryptocurrency was contributing to the consumption of fossil fuels and climate change. The decision resulted in the price of bitcoin dropping around 12% on 13 May. During a July bitcoin conference, Musk suggested Tesla could possibly help bitcoin miners switch to renewable energy in the future and also stated at the same conference that if bitcoin mining reaches, and trends above 50 percent renewable energy usage, that "Tesla would resume accepting bitcoin." The price for bitcoin rose after this announcement.

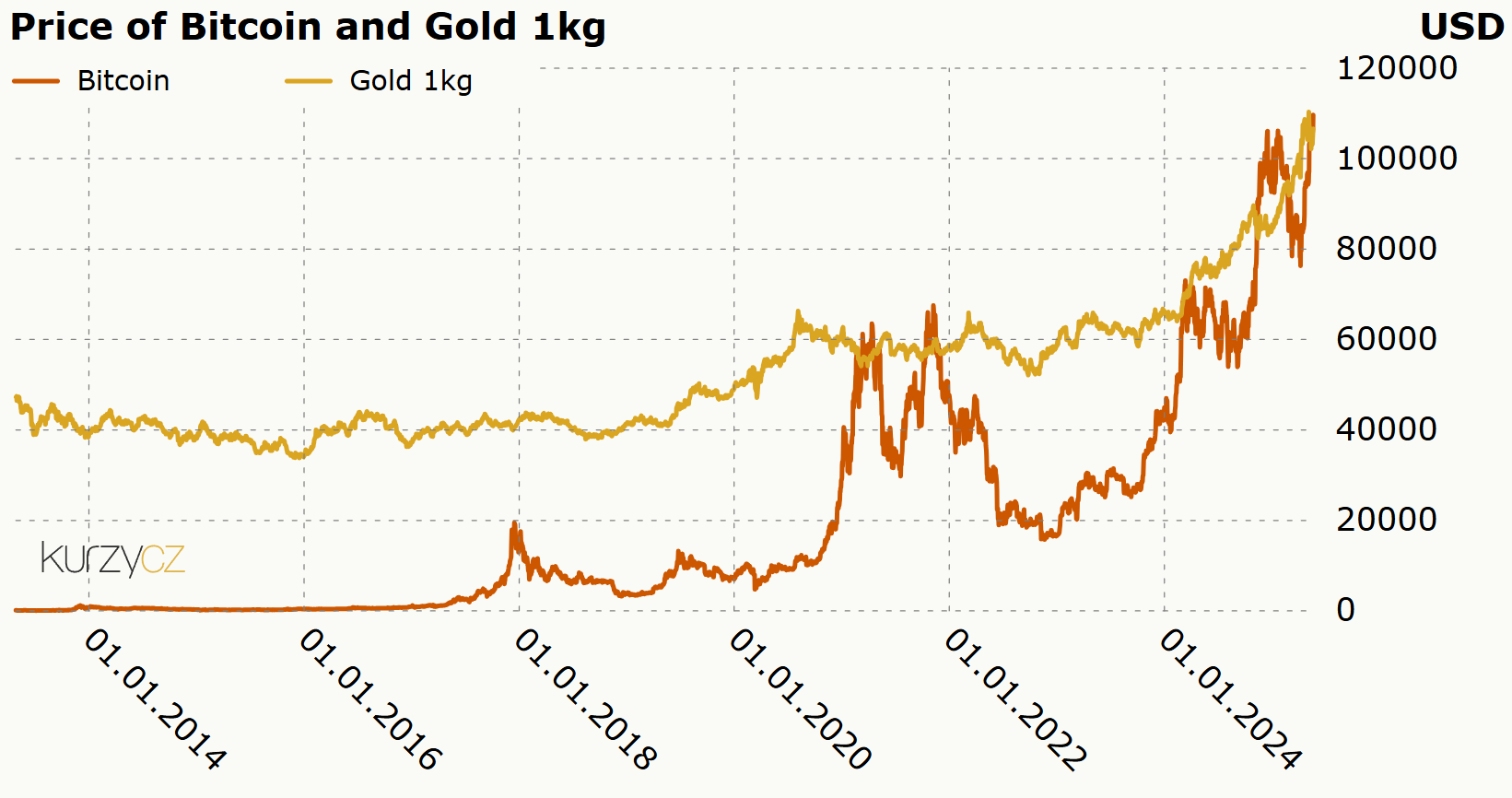
Bitcoin vs. 1 kg gold

From February 2021, the Swiss canton of Zug allows for tax payments in bitcoin and other cryptocurrencies. Bitcoin achieved price equivalence with one kilogram of gold. On 1 June 2021, El Salvador President Nayib Bukele announced his plans to adopt bitcoin as legal tender; this would render El Salvador the world's first country to do so. On June 7, 2021, United States Justice Department recovered $2.3 million worth of bitcoin paid by Colonial Pipeline to a criminal cyber group in cyber-security ransom. On 8 June 2021, at the initiative of the president, pro-government deputies in the Legislative Assembly of El Salvador voted legislation—Ley Bitcoin or the Bitcoin Law—to make Bitcoin legal tender in the country alongside the US Dollar.

=== 2022 ===
Bitcoin's price declined sharply in 2022 amid a sell-off in technology stocks and the collapse of Terra-Luna and its sister stablecoin, UST. In May 2022, following a vote by Wikipedia editors the previous month, the Wikimedia Foundation announced it would stop accepting donations in bitcoin or other cryptocurrencies—eight years after it had first started taking contributions in bitcoin.

== Network and financial-market developments, 2023–2024 ==
=== 2023 ===
In 2023, ordinals, non-fungible tokens (NFTs) on Bitcoin, went live.

=== 2024 ===
In January 2024, the U.S. Securities and Exchange Commission approved the listing and trading of spot bitcoin exchange-traded products. In April 2024, the fourth bitcoin halving occurred, meaning that the reward to miners for successfully completing a block dropped to 3.125 bitcoins from 6.25 bitcoins.

== Prices and value history ==
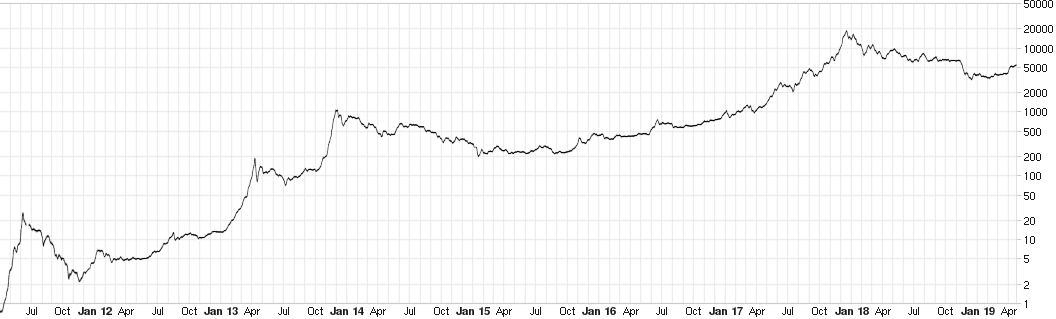
The price of a bitcoin reached US$1,139.9 on 4 January 2017 (semi logarithmic plot).

Among the factors which may have contributed to this rise were the European sovereign-debt crisis – particularly the 2012–2013 Cypriot financial crisis – statements by FinCEN improving the currency's legal standing, and rising media and Internet interest. Until 2013, almost all market with bitcoins were in United States dollars (US$).

As the market valuation of the total stock of bitcoins approached US$1 billion, some commentators called bitcoin prices a bubble. In early April 2013, the price per bitcoin dropped from $266 to around $50 and then rose to around $100. Over two weeks starting late June 2013 the price dropped steadily to $70. The price began to recover, peaking once again on 1 October at $140. On 2 October, The Silk Road was seized by the FBI. This seizure caused a flash crash to $110. The price quickly rebounded, returning to $200 several weeks later. The latest run went from $200 on 3 November to $900 on 18 November. Bitcoin passed US$1,000 on 28 November 2013 at Mt. Gox.

Bitcoin value history (comparison to US$)
Date	USD : 1 BTC	Notes
Jan 2009 – Mar 2010	basically nothing	No exchanges or market; users were mainly cryptography fans who were sending bitcoins for hobby purposes representing low or no value. In March 2010, user "SmokeTooMuch" auctioned 10,000 BTC for $50 (cumulatively), but no buyer was found.
May 2010	less than $0.01	10,000 BTC were exchanged for two pizzas in the first notable retail transaction involving physical goods.
Feb 2011 – April 2011	$1.00▲	Bitcoin takes parity with US dollar.
Nov 2013	$350–$1,242▲	Price rose from $150 in October to $200 in November, reaching $1,242 on 29 November 2013.
Apr 2014	$340–$530▼	The lowest price since the 2012–2013 Cypriot financial crisis had been reached at 3:25 AM on 11 April.
2–3 March 2017	$1,290+ ▲	Price broke above the November 2013 high of $1,242 and then traded above $1,290.
20 May 2017	$2,000 ▲	Price reached a new high, reaching $1,402.03 on 1 May 2017, and over $1,800 on 11 May 2017. On 20 May 2017, the price passed $2,000 for the first time.
1 September 2017	$5,014▲	Price broke $5,000 for the first time.
17–20 November 2017	$7,600-8,100 ▲	Briefly topped at $8004.59. This surge in bitcoin may be related to the 2017 Zimbabwean coup d'état. On one bitcoin exchange, 1 BTC topped at nearly $13,500, just shy of 2 times the value of the International market.
15 December 2017	$17,900 ▲	Price reached $17,900.
17 December 2017	$19,783 ▲	Price rose 5% in 24 hours, with its value being up 1,824% since 1 January 2017, to reach a new all-time high of $19,783.06.
22 December 2017	$13,800 ▼	Price lost one third of its value in 24 hours, dropping below $14,000.
5 February 2018	$6,200 ▼	Price dropped by 50% in 16 days, falling below $7,000.
31 October 2018	$6,300	On the 10th anniversary of bitcoin, the price held steady above $6,000 during a period of historically low volatility.
7 December 2018	$3,300 ▼	Price briefly dipped below $3,300, a 76% drop from the previous year and a 15-month low.
1 July 2019	$10,599 ▲	Rose to a calendar-year peak of $10,599 after starting the year at $3,869.
16 March 2020	$5,000 ▼	Price dropped 50% in early 2020, losing 25% in 24 hours early in the COVID-19 pandemic.
27 July 2020	$10,944 ▲	Price recovered value lost in COVID-related crash.
30 November 2020	$19,850 ▲	Bitcoin price reached new all-time high of $19,850.11.
8 January 2021	$41,973 ▲	Bitcoin traded as high as $41,973.
11 January 2021	$33,400 ▼	Price briefly fell as much as 26% but pared losses to trade around $33,400.
8 February 2021	$44,200 ▲	Bitcoin price surge after Elon Musk and Tesla announcements of investments into Bitcoin, including acceptance of payment.
16 February 2021	$50,000 ▲	Bitcoin price reached new all-time high of $50,000.
10 April 2021	$60,000 ▲	Bitcoin back above $60,000 as Coinbase gets ready to go public on the stock market.
14 April 2021	$64,800 ▲	The all-time high price of $64,800 was reached on April 14, 2021.
19 May 2021	$30,000 ▼	Bitcoin price drops to $30,000 at one point following suggestions that Tesla has sold or will sell its Bitcoin holdings and a new set of regulations from the Chinese government to support their cryptocurrency crackdown.
2 September 2021	$50,128 ▲	Bitcoin price recovered to $50,000
17 October 2021	$62,600 ▲	Bitcoin price returned near to its all-time high
20 October 2021	$66,975 ▲	Bitcoin price hits all-time high above $66,000
22 January 2022	$35,000 ▼	Bitcoin price falls almost 50% from all-time highs, to below $35,000
12 May 2022	$25,401 ▼	Following the Terra-LUNA crash in May 2022, Bitcoin retreated to its lowest level since December 2020. Traders seized the discounted bitcoin to buoy the price around the $30k mark.
13 June 2022	$22,602 ▼	Bitcoin slid to $22,601.69 as Celsius Network froze withdrawals and transfers, citing "extreme" conditions.
18 June 2022	$17,769 ▼	Bitcoin dropped below $18,000, to trade at levels beneath its 2017 highs.
27 June 2022	$20,700 ▲	Bitcoin traded around $20,700 as cryptocurrency hedge fund Three Arrows Capital defaulted on a bitcoin loan and was ordered into liquidation by a court in the British Virgin Islands.
28 November 2022	$16,216 ▼	Bitcoin took an immediate hit after the collapse of FTX, costing more than a million users of the exchange billions of dollars in cumulative losses. Bitcoin sunk to a two-year low.
14 January 2023	$20,853 ▲	Bitcoin rose back above $20,000 for first time in over two months
21 January 2023	$23,199 ▲	Bitcoin rose above $23,000 to its highest levels since August 2022
16 February 2023	$25,156 ▲	Bitcoin rose above $25,000 for the first time in eight months
10 March 2023	$20,000 ▼	Bitcoin fell below $20,000 for the first time since January 2023.
17 March 2023	$26,868 ▲	Bitcoin rose to $26,868.39, recording its best weekly gain since January 2021.
1 January 2024	$45,001 ▲	Bitcoin rose to $45,001.01, Bitcoin surges 7% to start 2024.
13 March 2024	$73,664 ▲	Bitcoin hit new record highs as US Bitcoin ETFs saw record-breaking inflows.
5 December 2024	$100,000 ▲	Bitcoin reached $100,000.
6 October 2025	$126,210 ▲	New all-time high.
30 June 2026	$57,717 ▼	Mid-summer low.

== Forks ==
A fork, referring to a blockchain, is defined variously as a blockchain split into two paths forward, or as a change of protocol rules. Accidental forks on the bitcoin network regularly occur as part of the mining process. They happen when two miners find a block at a similar point in time. As a result, the network briefly forks. This fork is subsequently resolved by the software which automatically chooses the longest chain, thereby orphaning the extra blocks added to the shorter chain (that were dropped by the longer chain).

=== March 2013 ===
On 12 March 2013, a bitcoin miner running version 0.8.0 of the bitcoin software created a large block that was considered invalid in version 0.7 (due to an undiscovered inconsistency between the two versions). This created a split or "fork" in the blockchain since computers with the recent version of the software accepted the invalid block and continued to build on the diverging chain, whereas older versions of the software rejected it and continued extending the blockchain without the offending block. This split resulted in two separate transaction logs being formed without clear consensus, which allowed for the same funds to be spent differently on each chain. In response, the Mt. Gox exchange temporarily halted bitcoin deposits. The exchange rate fell 23% to $37 on the Mt. Gox exchange but rose most of the way back to its prior level of $48. Miners resolved the split by downgrading to version 0.7, putting them back on track with the canonical blockchain. User funds largely remained unaffected and were available when network consensus was restored. The network reached consensus and continued to operate as normal a few hours after the split.

=== August 2017 ===
Before 1 August 2017, bitcoin users followed a common set of protocol rules. On 1 August 2017, bitcoin split into two chains: the Bitcoin (BTC) chain, with a 1 MB block-size limit, and the Bitcoin Cash (BCH) chain, with an 8 MB block-size limit. The split has been called the Bitcoin Cash hard fork.

Segregated Witness was also implemented on the Bitcoin chain through a soft fork during the same month.

== Taxation and regulation ==
=== 2012 ===
In 2012, the Cryptocurrency Legal Advocacy Group (CLAG) stressed the importance for taxpayers to determine whether taxes are due on a bitcoin-related transaction based on whether one has experienced a "realization event": when a taxpayer has provided a service in exchange for bitcoins, a realization event has probably occurred and any gain or loss would likely be calculated using fair market values for the service provided." In April 2012 the FBI acknowledged Bitcoin's potential for illicit use in an internal assessment. The report identified Bitcoin’s decentralized and pseudonymous design as a challenge for law enforcement, noting early signs of adoption by cybercriminals despite limited evidence of widespread misuse. Although it warned of high theft risks via malware and wallet exploitation, it concluded only with low confidence that, "based on current user and vendor acceptance, that malicious actors will exploit Bitcoin to launder money". The report highlighted third-party exchanges as regulatory choke points under U.S. law, marking one of the first federal acknowledgments of the systemic enforcement difficulties posed by cryptocurrencies. In its October 2012 study, Virtual currency schemes, the European Central Bank concluded that the growth of virtual currencies will continue, and, given the currencies' inherent price instability, lack of close regulation, and risk of illegal uses by anonymous users, the Bank warned that periodic examination of developments would be necessary to reassess risks.

=== 2013 ===
On 18 March 2013, the Financial Crimes Enforcement Network (or FinCEN), a bureau of the United States Department of the Treasury, issued a report regarding centralized and decentralized "virtual currencies" and their legal status within "money services business" (MSB) and Bank Secrecy Act regulations. It classified digital currencies and other digital payment systems such as bitcoin as "virtual currencies" because they are not legal tender under any sovereign jurisdiction. FinCEN cleared American users of bitcoin of legal obligations by saying, "A user of virtual currency is not an MSB under FinCEN's regulations and therefore is not subject to MSB registration, reporting, and recordkeeping regulations." However, it held that American entities who generate "virtual currency" such as bitcoins are money transmitters or MSBs if they sell their generated currency for national currency: "...a person that creates units of convertible virtual currency and sells those units to another person for real currency or its equivalent is engaged in transmission to another location and is a money transmitter." This specifically extends to "miners" of the bitcoin currency who may have to register as MSBs and abide by the legal requirements of being a money transmitter if they sell their generated bitcoins for national currency and are within the United States. Since FinCEN issued this guidance, dozens of virtual currency exchangers and administrators have registered with FinCEN, and FinCEN is receiving an increasing number of suspicious activity reports (SARs) from these entities.

Additionally, FinCEN claimed regulation over American entities that manage bitcoins in a payment processor setting or as an exchanger: "In addition, a person is an exchanger and a money transmitter if the person accepts such de-centralized convertible virtual currency from one person and transmits it to another person as part of the acceptance and transfer of currency, funds, or other value that substitutes for currency." In summary, FinCEN's decision would require bitcoin exchanges where bitcoins are traded for traditional currencies to disclose large transactions and suspicious activity, comply with money laundering regulations, and collect information about their customers as traditional financial institutions are required to do. Jennifer Shasky Calvery, the director of FinCEN said, "Virtual currencies are subject to the same rules as other currencies. ... Basic money-services business rules apply here."

In June 2013, Bitcoin Foundation board member Jon Matonis wrote in Forbes that he received a warning letter from the California Department of Financial Institutions accusing the foundation of unlicensed money transmission. Matonis denied that the foundation is engaged in money transmission and said he viewed the case as "an opportunity to educate state regulators." In late July 2013, the industry group Committee for the Establishment of the Digital Asset Transfer Authority began to form to set best practices and standards, to work with regulators and policymakers to adapt existing currency requirements to digital currency technology and business models and develop risk management standards. In August 2013, the German Finance Ministry characterized bitcoin as a unit of account, usable in multilateral clearing circles and subject to capital gains tax if held less than one year.

On 5 December 2013, the People's Bank of China announced in a press release regarding bitcoin regulation that whilst individuals in China are permitted to freely trade and exchange bitcoins as a commodity, it is prohibited for Chinese financial banks to operate using bitcoins or for bitcoins to be used as legal tender currency, and that entities dealing with bitcoins must track and report suspicious activity to prevent money laundering. The value of bitcoin dropped on various exchanges between 11 and 20 percent following the regulation announcement, before rebounding upward again. Also in 2013, the U.S. Treasury extended its anti-money laundering regulations to processors of bitcoin transactions.

=== 2014 ===
In 2014, the U.S. Securities and Exchange Commission filed an administrative action against Erik T. Voorhees, for violating Securities Act Section 5 for publicly offering unregistered interests in two bitcoin websites in exchange for bitcoins. On 25 March 2014, the U.S. Internal Revenue Service issued Notice 2014-21, clarifying that for federal tax purposes, virtual currency is treated as property, not currency.

=== 2016 ===
In 2016, the European Parliament began discussions to bring virtual currency exchanges and custodian wallet providers under the scope of the Anti-Money Laundering Directive (AMLD). The proposal was published in July 2016, marking "a significant step in the EU's efforts to combat the laundering of money from criminal activities and to counter the financing of terrorist activities."

=== 2017 ===
By December 2017, bitcoin futures contracts began to be offered, and the US Chicago Board Options Exchange (CBOE) was formally settling the futures daily.

=== 2019 ===
By 2019, multiple trading companies were offering services around bitcoin futures.

== Bitcoin faucets ==
A bitcoin faucet was a website or software app that dispensed rewards in the form of bitcoin for visitors to claim in exchange for completing a captcha or task as described by the website. There have also been faucets that dispense other cryptocurrencies. The first example was called "The Bitcoin Faucet" and was developed by Gavin Andresen in 2010. It originally gave out five bitcoins per person. The rewards were dispensed at regular time intervals as rewards for completing simple tasks such as captcha completion, or as prizes from simple games. The amount of bitcoin would typically fluctuate according to the cash value of bitcoin. Some faucets also had random larger rewards. To reduce mining fees, faucets saved up these small individual payments in their own ledgers, which would be dispersed as larger payment to a user's bitcoin address.

Because bitcoin transactions are irreversible and there have been many faucets, they have been targets for hackers interested in acquiring bitcoins through theft or exploitation. Advertisements were the main income source of bitcoin faucets, with the potential reward in cryptocurrency intended to incentivize traffic. Some ad networks have also paid directly in bitcoin. Faucets typically have a low profit margin. Some faucets have also made money by mining cryptocurrencies in the background, using the user's CPU.

== Theft and exchange shutdowns ==
Bitcoins can be stored in a bitcoin cryptocurrency wallet. Theft of bitcoin has been documented on numerous occasions. At other times, bitcoin exchanges have shut down, taking their clients' bitcoins with them. A Wired study published April 2013 showed that 45 percent of bitcoin exchanges end up closing. On 19 June 2011, a security breach of the Mt. Gox bitcoin exchange caused the nominal price of a bitcoin to fraudulently drop to one cent on the Mt. Gox exchange, after a hacker used credentials from a Mt. Gox auditor's compromised computer illegally to transfer a large number of bitcoins to himself. They used the exchange's software to sell them all nominally, creating a massive "ask" order at any price. Within minutes, the price reverted to its correct user-traded value. Accounts with the equivalent of more than US$8,750,000 were affected. In July 2011, the operator of Bitomat, the third-largest bitcoin exchange, announced that he had lost access to his wallet.dat file with about 17,000 bitcoins (roughly equivalent to US$220,000 at that time). He announced that he would sell the service for the missing amount, aiming to use funds from the sale to refund his customers.

In August 2011, MyBitcoin, a now defunct bitcoin transaction processor, declared that it was hacked, which caused it to be shut down, paying 49% on customer deposits, leaving more than 78,000 bitcoins (equivalent to roughly US$800,000 at that time) unaccounted for. In early August 2012, a lawsuit was filed in San Francisco court against Bitcoinica – a bitcoin trading venue – claiming about US$460,000 from the company. Bitcoinica was hacked twice in 2012, which led to allegations that the venue neglected the safety of customers' money and cheated them out of withdrawal requests. In late August 2012, an operation titled Bitcoin Savings and Trust was shut down by the owner, leaving around US$5.6 million in bitcoin-based debts; this led to allegations that the operation was a Ponzi scheme. In September 2012, the U.S. Securities and Exchange Commission had reportedly started an investigation on the case.

In September 2012, Bitfloor, a bitcoin exchange, also reported being hacked, with 24,000 bitcoins (worth about US$250,000) stolen. As a result, Bitfloor suspended operations. The same month, Bitfloor resumed operations; its founder said that he reported the theft to FBI, and that he plans to repay the victims, though the time frame for repayment is unclear. On 3 April 2013, Instawallet, a web-based wallet provider, was hacked, resulting in the theft of over 35,000 bitcoins which were valued at US$129.90 per bitcoin at the time, or nearly $4.6 million in total. As a result, Instawallet suspended operations. On 11 August 2013, the Bitcoin Foundation announced that a bug in a pseudorandom number generator within the Android operating system had been exploited to steal from wallets generated by Android apps; fixes were provided 13 August 2013.

In October 2013, Inputs.io, an Australian-based bitcoin wallet provider was hacked with a loss of 4100 bitcoins, worth over A$1 million at time of theft. The service was run by the operator TradeFortress. Coinchat, the associated bitcoin chat room, was taken over by a new admin. On 26 October 2013, a Hong Kong–based bitcoin trading platform owned by Global Bond Limited (GBL) vanished with 30 million yuan (US$5 million) from 500 investors. Mt. Gox, the Japan-based exchange that in 2013 handled 70% of all worldwide bitcoin traffic, declared bankruptcy in February 2014, with bitcoins worth about $390 million missing, for unclear reasons. The CEO was eventually arrested and charged with embezzlement.

On 3 March 2014, Flexcoin announced it was closing its doors because of a hack attack that took place the day before. In a statement that once occupied their homepage they announced on 3 March 2014 that "As Flexcoin does not have the resources, assets, or otherwise to come back from this loss [the hack], we are closing our doors immediately." Users can no longer log into the site. Chinese cryptocurrency exchange Bter lost $2.1 million in BTC in February 2015. The Slovenian exchange Bitstamp lost bitcoin worth $5.1 million to a hack in January 2015. The US-based exchange Cryptsy declared bankruptcy in January 2016, ostensibly because of a 2014 hacking incident; the court-appointed receiver later alleged that Cryptsy's CEO had stolen $3.3 million. In August 2016, hackers stole some $72 million in customer bitcoin from the Hong Kong–based exchange Bitfinex. In December 2017, hackers stole 4,700 bitcoins from NiceHash, a platform that allowed users to sell hashing power. The value of the stolen bitcoins totaled about $80 million at the time. On 19 December 2017, Yapian, a company that owns the Youbit cryptocurrency exchange in South Korea, filed for bankruptcy following a hack, the second in eight months. On 11 November 2022, FTX filed for bankruptcy with an estimated $8 billion missing in customer funds.

== Arbitrary blockchain content ==
Bitcoin's blockchain can be loaded with arbitrary data. In 2018 researchers from RWTH Aachen University and Goethe University identified 1,600 files added to the blockchain, 59 of which included links to unlawful images of child exploitation, politically sensitive content, or privacy violations. "Our analysis shows that certain content, e.g. illegal pornography, can render the mere possession of a blockchain illegal." Interpol also sent out an alert in 2015 saying that "the design of the blockchain means there is the possibility of malware being injected and permanently hosted with no methods currently available to wipe this data".
