= Bitcoin Billionaires =

2019 book by Ben Mezrich

Bitcoin Billionaires: A True Story of Genius, Betrayal, and Redemption
- First edition
- Author: Ben Mezrich
- Language: English
- Subject: bitcoin, cryptocurrency
- Genre: Non-fiction
- Publisher: Flatiron Books
- Publication date: May 21, 2019
- Publication place: United States
- Media type: Print
- Pages: 288
- ISBN: 978-1250217745

Bitcoin Billionaires: A True Story of Genius, Betrayal, and Redemption is a 2019 book by Ben Mezrich. A sequel to The Accidental Billionaires, the book traces Cameron and Tyler Winklevoss' journey into the world of cryptocurrency, investing in bitcoin and encountering early adopters Charlie Shrem, Roger Ver, Erik Voorhees, Naval Ravikant and Dan Kaminsky, in the face of mounting scrutiny from government regulators and the financial establishment.

== Sources ==
Mezrich knew the Winklevoss twins from researching The Accidental Billionaires. Initially viewing them as the "bad guys", his perception changed over the course of writing the book and they stayed in touch. In 2017, after reading the New York Times article by Nathaniel Popper, How the Winklevoss Twins Found Vindication in a Bitcoin Fortune, Mezrich emailed them and they shared their story with him.

== Content ==
The story begins at the conclusion of the Winklevoss' lawsuit with Mark Zuckerberg in 2008. Both parties agree to a settlement, the twins receiving $20 million in cash and $45 million in Facebook stock. Neither is satisfied with the outcome.

With their new liquid capital, the twins found Winklevoss Capital Management, with the goal of investing in tech startups. After promising meetings, they discover they are considered pariahs. Silicon Valley startups, fearing reprisals from Facebook, don't want to be associated with them.

In summer 2012, during a party in Ibiza, the twins are approached by David Azar, a friend of Charlie Shrem's, who tells them about a new method of online payment with better privacy and transaction speed: bitcoin.

After meeting Shrem in Brooklyn, the twins become the largest investors in his bitcoin exchange, BitInstant. They acquire over $2 million in bitcoin or roughly 1% of all bitcoins in existence. The twins become ambassadors for bitcoin, attempting to reverse stigma due to its initial association with Silk Road. This culminates in them delivering the keynote at the 2013 Bitcoin conference.

As CEO of BitInstant, Shrem becomes a crypto celebrity, travelling with the twins and giving presentations to potential investors and interviews to media. Shrem is torn between the influence of Roger Ver, another early investor in BitInstant with strong libertarian views, and the twins' insistence to adhere to government regulations. Shrem's work declines as he descends into partying and drugs and he is eventually arrested at JFK airport. The twins are subpoenaed by the United States Attorney for the Southern District of New York, to speak at a public hearing on the future of cryptocurrency.

Parts of the book center on isolated moments related to bitcoin, such as describing the lengths the Winklevosses went to securing their bitcoins, described as a "reverse heist", and the 2012–2013 Cypriot financial crisis.

== Critical reception ==
The book was widely praised by critics upon its release and it is generally rated between four and five stars across a range of reviews online. In a published review by Steven Poole for The Guardian, he commends Menzies for writing the book with a "slick beauty" that is structured as a series of dramatic sequences. Moreover, Poole describes the book as being as novelistic and painless to read as could be possible about the subject of the modern tech world.
