= Roger Ver =

Kittitian-Antiguan promoter of Bitcoin (born 1979)

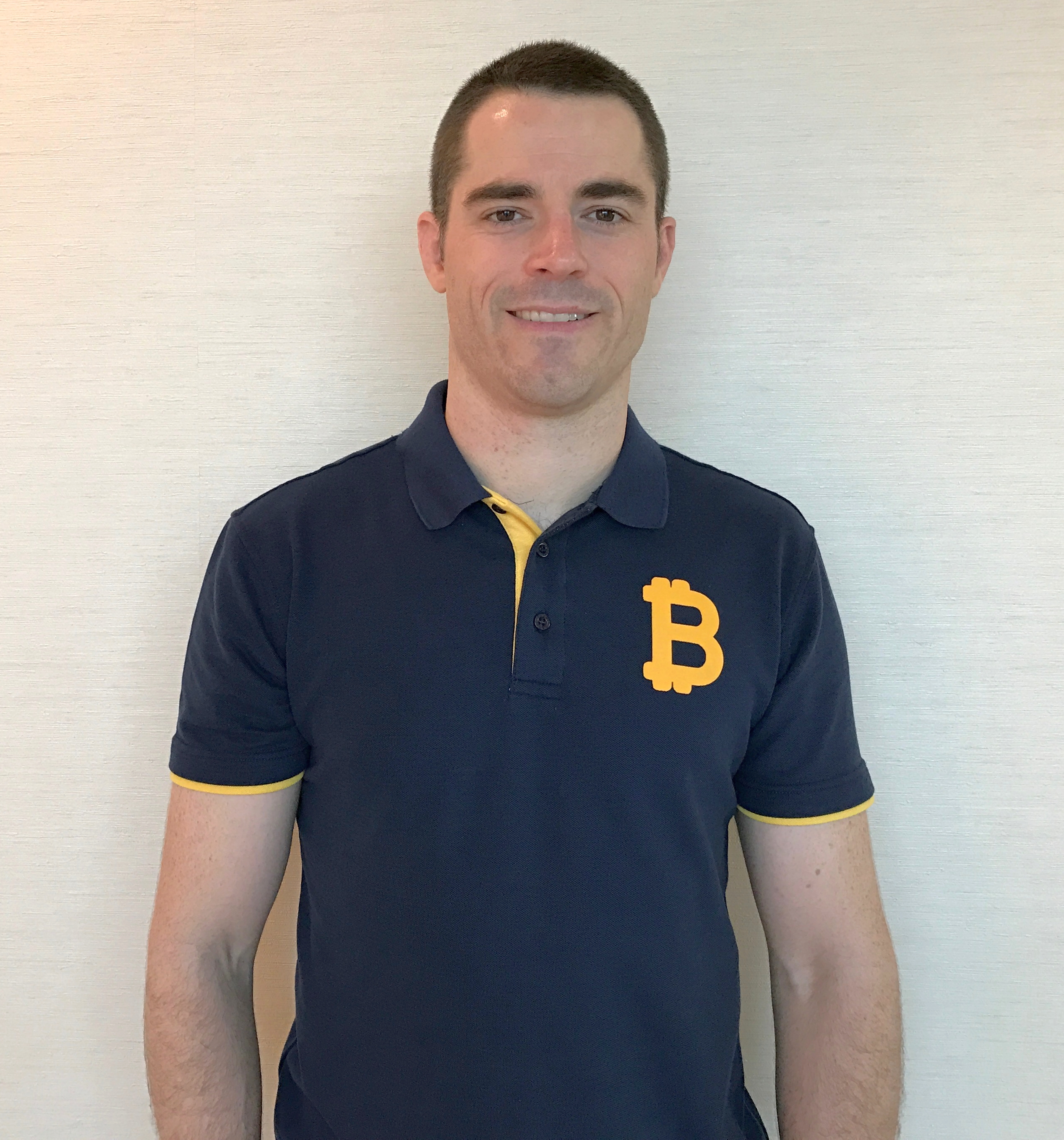
- Ver, December 2016
- Born: 1979 (age 46–47); San Jose, California, U.S.
- Occupation: Entrepreneur
- Known for: Promoting Bitcoin, Bitcoin Cash
- Movement: Libertarianism, anarcho-capitalism, Voluntaryism
- Website: rogerver.com

Roger Keith Ver (born 1979) is an entrepreneur best known as the first investor in Bitcoin and the Bitcoin ecosystem. He was an early promoter of Bitcoin and Bitcoin-related startups and is sometimes known as "Bitcoin Jesus" for his evangelism of cryptocurrency in its early days.

While Ver has often been associated with Bitcoin Cash, he has consistently emphasized that he supports any cryptocurrency that functions as "peer-to-peer cash", as originally cited in the Bitcoin whitepaper authored by Satoshi Nakamoto. He previously was CEO of Bitcoin.com, later becoming its Executive Chairman.

In 2014, he renounced his United States citizenship after obtaining citizenship in Saint Kitts and Nevis. In 2024, he was indicted for tax fraud but eventually settled the case with the IRS and was not pursued criminally.

== Early life and education ==
Ver was born in 1979 in San Jose, California. He attended Valley Christian High School and then De Anza College for one year.

== Career ==
From 1999 until 2012, Ver was the CEO of MemoryDealers.com, an online business that sold networking equipment. In 2000, he ran for the California State Assembly as a Libertarian Party candidate. During his campaign, he strongly criticized federal law enforcement agencies, referring to the ATF and FBI as "jack-booted thugs and murderers" for their role in the Waco Siege.

=== Cryptocurrency ===
Ver began investing in bitcoin in early 2011 when a single Bitcoin cost around $1 each. His first investment was in Charlie Shrem’s Bitinstant, which allowed the company to hire its first designer and programmer.

He went on to invest over $1 million in early Bitcoin startups, including Ripple (XRP), where he was a co-founder and the second person ever involved after Jed McCaleb, Blockchain.com also as a co-founder, first investor, and second person ever involved after Ben Reeves, BitPay providing its initial seed funding, and Kraken as the seed investor.

In 2011, Ver's company MemoryDealers became the first established business in the world to accept Bitcoin as payment. Also, in this same year he co-founded the Silicon Valley Bitcoin Meetup, one of the earliest Bitcoin meetup groups worldwide, helping to organize events and expand awareness. In mid-2011, during Bitcoin's first major price crash, Ver and Jesse Powell assisted Mt. Gox with operational issues, helping the company to navigate technical and business challenges. Ver began paying for national radio Bitcoin advertisements on the libertarian radio show Free Talk Live, which was aired on more than 100 radio stations. Ver additionally paid for the world's first Bitcoin billboard advertisement. It was posted along one of the busiest expressways in Silicon Valley. Lastly, in 2011, Ver made his public "Bitcoin Bet" that Bitcoin would outperform gold, silver, platinum, and the US stock market by over one hundred times over the next two years.

He was also among the five founding members of the Bitcoin Foundation. Ver has long promoted Bitcoin as a tool for economic freedom. In 2017, he supported the Bitcoin XT project, which pushed for larger Bitcoin block sizes.Although often linked to Bitcoin Cash, Ver has clarified that he is not its creator.

In June 2022, the cryptocurrency exchange CoinFLEX halted withdrawals and publicly blamed Ver for an alleged debt of $47 million. Ver rejected these claims, stating that CoinFLEX itself defrauded him. He later sued the company, and a settlement confirmed that Ver was owed over $100 million USD.

== Published works ==
In 2015, Digital Gold was published, highlighting the role Ver had played in Bitcoin up to that time.

In 2024, Ver self-published the book Hijacking Bitcoin, a book detailing the history and evolution of Bitcoin.

== Personal life ==
Ver describes himself as libertarian, anarcho-capitalist, and voluntaryist. He has lived in multiple countries, including Japan (since 2006), Saint Kitts and Nevis, Antigua, and others. He renounced his United States citizenship in 2014. In 2023, Ver was given the title of Duke and became the Minister of Finance for the Joseon Cybernation.

Ver has competed in Brazilian jiu-jitsu, earning a black belt and competing internationally.

=== Legal issues ===
Diplomatic letter from Andrew Lee addressed to Álvaro García Ortiz, regarding Ver.

In 2002, Ver pleaded guilty to selling high-yield firecrackers on eBay. He was sentenced to 10 months in federal prison.

In April 2024, Ver was arrested in Spain on a U.S. indictment for alleged tax evasion. Ver hired Roger Stone to lobby Congress for an end to the tax provision he was accused of violating and hired lawyer Chris Kise to his legal team. On October 14, 2025, Ver reached a resolution with the U.S. Department of Justice by entering into a deferred prosecution agreement to settle federal tax charges. As part of the agreement, Ver was required to pay $49.9 million. The government subsequently dismissed the indictment against him.

In 2020, he acquired citizenship in Antigua and Barbuda. In April 2024, he was indicted in the United States on tax fraud charges, which he disputes. The U.S. government considered him a fugitive until the second Donald Trump administration struck a deal with Ver, enabling him to avoid prison. Ver had hired a team of lawyers with close ties to Trump and lobbied Trump for a pardon.

== See also ==
- History of Bitcoin
