= ShapeShift =

Swiss digital asset trading company

- Type: Private
- Industry: Cryptocurrency
- Founded: July 2014
- Founder: Erik Voorhees
- Defunct: 2021
- Headquarters: Switzerland
- Key people: Erik Voorhees
- Website: shapeshift.com

ShapeShift AG was a cryptocurrency exchange which operated from 2014 to 2021 and was headquartered in Switzerland.

== History ==
ShapeShift AG was founded July 1, 2014 in Switzerland by Erik Voorhees.

In March 2015, ShapeShift received a US$525,000 seed-stage investment by Roger Ver and Barry Silbert. Additional funding totaling US$1.6 million were raised by September 2015, from investors in a second funding round including Digital Currency Group, Bitfinex, Bitcoin Capital and Mardal Investments.

ShapeShift released initially on the iOS platform in June 2015, allowing users to swap 25 digital currencies and value tokens.

On 11 June 2015, ShapeShift "cut off service to New York in response to the state’s new regulatory policy for digital currency businesses, ... BitLicense," which was released in June with the final regulations approved in August.

In March 2017, ShapeShift raised $10.4 million in series A funding from both US and international venture capital firms. Berlin-based Earlybird Venture Capital was the lead investor, with additional funding from Lakestar, Access Venture Partners, Pantera Capital and Blockchain Capital.

ShapeShift, unlike many exchanges, did not require user identification, allowing for anonymous transactions. This lack of oversight enabled criminals, including North Korean hackers and Ponzi scheme operators, to launder nearly $90 million in criminal proceeds, with ShapeShift processing the largest portion of these funds among exchanges with U.S. presence. ShapeShift's policy facilitated the conversion of traceable cryptocurrencies like Bitcoin into untraceable ones like Monero, effectively obscuring the money trail. A 2018 investigation by the Wall Street Journal alleged that ShapeShift had facilitated money laundering of $90 million in funds from criminal activities over a two-year period.

Shortly after, the company began requiring personal identification information from its customers on October 1, 2018.
