= Jesse Proudman =

American technology entrepreneur

Jesse Proudman is a Seattle-based technology entrepreneur. He is co-founder, President and CTO of Venice.ai, a privacy-focused artificial intelligence platform.

== Career ==
=== Blue Box ===
Proudman founded Blue Box Group in 2003, a company that provided private cloud as a service based on OpenStack technology. The company raised over $22 million in venture capital and was acquired by IBM in 2015. Following the acquisition, Proudman joined IBM as a Distinguished Engineer, where he worked on blockchain and cryptocurrency initiatives until 2017. Blue Box won GeekWire's Deal of the Year award in 2016. He was named GeekWire's Young Entrepreneur of the Year in 2014.

=== Strix Leviathan and Makara ===
In 2018, after leaving IBM, Proudman co-founded Strix Leviathan, a quantitative trading and investment management platform for digital assets. Strix Leviathan raised a $1.625 million seed round in March 2018.

Strix Leviathan spun out Makara in 2021, which became the first SEC-registered cryptocurrency robo-advisor. Makara was acquired by Betterment in February 2022.

=== Venice.ai ===
In 2024, Proudman began building Venice.ai with co-founder Erik Voorhees, initially working nights and weekends before joining full-time. He joined Venice full-time as CTO in March 2025. Venice provides private, uncensored access to open-source AI models, storing user data locally in the browser rather than on company servers.

In July 2026, Venice raised a $65 million Series A funding round at a $1 billion valuation, led by Dragonfly with backing from Coinbase Ventures and others. By that time, the platform had grown to over four million users and $100 million in annualized revenue.

== Education ==
Proudman attended the University of Puget Sound.
