= Bitcoin buried in Newport landfill =

Cryptocurrency buried in city in Wales

Coordinates: 51°33′50″N 02°59′54″W

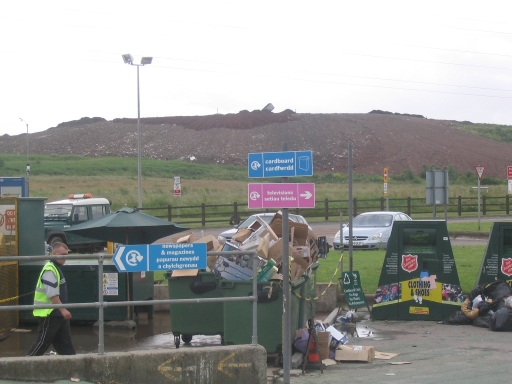
Docksway landfill, Newport, Wales, 2007. The hard drive containing the private key was buried here in 2013.

In 2013, Welsh computer engineer James Howells mistakenly disposed of a laptop hard drive containing the private key for 8,000 (Note: Reports of the total number of Bitcoin lost were initially 7,500 in 2013, 2017, until 2021, followed by 8,000 from 2022 onwards.) Bitcoin in the Docksway landfill in Newport, Wales. Howells subsequently assembled a team of specialists and secured funding to excavate the site, but Newport City Council refused permission, citing galvanic corrosion of the device and health concerns of city residents, including dangerous gases, methane, asbestos, the unearthing of hazardous materials, toxic leachate, and potential landfill fires. If the coins are discovered, Howells proposes distributing 30% of the proceedings among the council and the population of Newport.

As of February 2025, the missing Bitcoin was worth £597 million (US$751 million). In December 2024, Howells sued the council for £495 million, with the council contesting that the device is now its property. Howells and his team are confident that retrieval of the data remains possible, while the council continues to profess its scepticism. Following a hearing, the High Court dismissed Howells' claim in January 2025, ruling that it had no prospect of success.

== Background ==
Logarithmic chart showing the number of Bitcoin transactions per month since 2009, when Howells began studying the protocol.

=== Creation of Bitcoin ===
Bitcoin, the first decentralized cryptocurrency, was announced in October 2008 with the whitepaper Bitcoin: A Peer-to-Peer Electronic Cash System by Satoshi Nakamoto, followed by the implementation of the protocol as a peer-to-peer network in January 2009. It is a significant digital currency that uses cryptography to verify blockchain transactions and record them in a public ledger.

=== James Howells ===
James Howells, a Welsh computer engineer from Newport, began building computers at the age of 13, became a Napster user around the time of Bitcoin's inception, and learnt about encryption while working on a Bowman communications system. He taught himself about Bitcoin in December 2008 and began studying the concept a month later. After the 2008 financial crisis, Howells considered fiat currencies a "scam", favouring the vision of Bitcoin inventor Nakamoto instead. He became an early adopter of the technology in 2009.

== Early Bitcoin mining ==
Logarithmic mining difficulty chart of Bitcoin, showing the ease of mining in 2009 when Howells started mining.

On 15 February 2009, Howells started mining Bitcoin with a Dell XPS laptop. He recalled mining 400–800 Bitcoin intermittently overnight for two months, which caused his device to overheat. Howells later damaged the device and dismantled it for parts, selling some on eBay. The laptop, containing 32 kilobytes of Bitcoin private keys, was also used for gaming, and held music, e-mails and family photographs. The Telegraph considers Howells one of the earliest miners on the Bitcoin network, with The New Yorker further identifying him as one of only five miners at the time of his participation.

== Disposal of hard drive ==
Between 20 June and 10 August 2013, Howells accidentally disposed of an encrypted hard drive, mistaking one device for another. The disposed hard drive contained the cryptographic private key for 8,000 Bitcoin valued at £500,000 at the time. According to reports, Hafina Eddy-Evans, Howells's partner at the time, took the rubbish with the hard drive to the tip (landfill). According to Eddy-Evans, Howells "begged" her to take the unwanted items to the tip. She denies fault, while Howells said he "subconsciously" blames her for the loss of the hard drive.

Around October 29, 2013, Howells realized that the wrong drive had been thrown out. One Bitcoin was valued at about US$200 at this time. By November 2013, the device was approximately three to five feet underground in Docksway landfill, Newport, South Wales, with an approximate value of £4 million. At the time, Howells accepted that the coins were lost for good. Newport City Council notes that the hard drive was likely "buried under 25,000 cubic meters of waste and earth", weighing approximately 110,000–200,000 tonnes, with CNN saying that finding the device would be "almost impossible". The former manager of the landfill site says the hard drive is located in a 15,000 tonne section named Cell 2, where waste was buried between August and November 2013. The site holds 1.4 million tonnes of waste in total.

== Search attempts ==
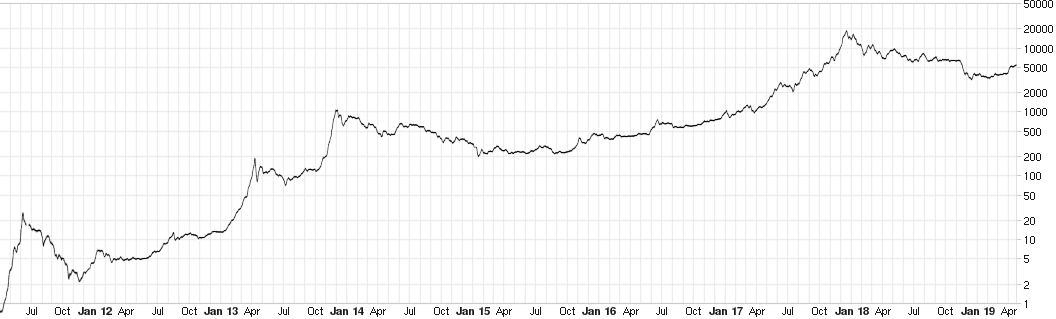
Logarithmic chart of the price of Bitcoin between 2011 and 2019, showing the increase in the value of the hard drive since its disposal. As the value has increased, Howells has escalated his attempts to try and retrieve the device.

In December 2017, Wired reported that the Newport City Council refused to allow Howells to search for the hard drive. According to Howells, the proposed search involves the first case, unrelated to a criminal investigation, of excavating a landfill site in the United Kingdom. The council has cited cost concerns, safety concerns, health concerns of city residents, galvanic corrosion of the device, and environmental impact including dangerous gases, methane, the unearthing of hazardous materials, toxic leachates, and potential landfill fires. A former manager of the landfill site has confirmed that asbestos is buried adjacent to the section that Howells wants to dig. Initially the council took a soft approach to the situation, indicating that they would return the device if found, but later took a tougher stance, and stated that the landfill is not open to the public and that trespassing would be a criminal offence.

In January 2021, after repeatedly requesting access to search for the device, Howells offered the council 25% of the proceedings then valued at approximately £200 million. He offered to donate £52.5 million (US$71.7 million) to the council which would go to the 316,000 people of Newport, equivalent to £175 per person. The council refused, claiming that the council was not permitted to excavate the site under its licensing permit with Natural Resources Wales. Howells believes the drive is still functional due to its protective casing and the anti-corrosive cobalt layer coating the glass disk.

To support his search efforts, Howells acquired financial support from a hedge fund with whom he would split 50% of the proceedings. He believes that using council waste records they can identify the location of the device. After they identify and find the hard drive, a team of data recovery specialists would help recover the Bitcoin. The council estimates that the excavation would cost millions of pounds, with Howells budgeting £5 million for a 9–12 month operation.

There is also no guarantee that the hard drive is even at the landfill site, and even if it was, the chance of it being found and in a recoverable condition after being in a landfill site for nine years, exposed to high pressures and a corrosive environment, are extremely slim.

— Newport City Council,
22 January 2023

In August 2022, Howells expanded his search plan to include the use of artificial intelligence using a mechanical arm to scan waste to identify the hard drive; the plan also called for using drones, and Boston Dynamics robotic dogs for security, as well as recruiting an AI specialist and an environmental team to the project. His team includes eight experts in landfill excavation, and a data recovery advisor who helped recover the black box from the Space Shuttle Columbia disaster. The budget also increased to £10–11 million with the help of venture capitalists who would retain 30% of the proceedings along with Howells.

Additionally, Howells now intended to develop a community-owned mining facility on the landfill site with the proceedings. The facility would use solar or wind power. That same year, Richard Hammond produced a short documentary on Howells's quest to retrieve the drive involving the recovery team, and by September 2023, the team doubled in size.

== Litigation and aftermath ==
Howells's legal team published an open letter to the Newport City Council on 6 September 2023 with his intention to sue. The letter sought to prevent future works on the site while seeking £446 million in damages and a judicial review of the council's decision refusing access to the site. Two months later, his legal team wrote again to the council requesting access prior to pursuing a case in court.

By October 2024, the contents of the hard drive were estimated at $750 million. Howells sued the council for £495 million, setting a date for a commerce court in Cardiff in December 2024, arguing for intellectual property rights among other claims. According to Wales Online, Howells was represented by the same team of barristers that also represented some of the alleged victims against Mohamed Al-Fayed. In response, the council argued that they legally own the device as the property was deposited to the site; Howells's barristers denied such claim based on intent.

The council requested a High Court hearing on 3 December with the intent to have the case dismissed. The Judge postponed the verdict until a later date. Council barristers argued Howells attempted to "bribe the council" by offering a percentage of the Bitcoin to the local community. Howells's legal team contested, arguing that their client was entitled to search for his missing hard drive.

In a judgement issued on 9 January 2025, Judge Keyser (KC) dismissed Howells' claim, saying that it had "no realistic prospect of succeeding". Howells told WalesOnline he was "very disappointed" but that he had a new plan to start a cryptocurrency called based on his inaccessible Bitcoin wealth. He appealed the judgement to the Court of Appeal, but the appeal was dismissed in March 2025.

In February 2025, the Newport City Council stated that the landfill would close. The same month, Howells announced a proposal to purchase the landfill from the city, which The New York Times described as a "last-ditch effort". He wrote to the council in July 2025 with a formal offer to purchase a portion of the landfill for £25 million. The council responded by stating that Howells needed to pay £117,000 in legal fees from his previous litigation before further discussion. In August 2025, Howells stated to Forbes Australia that he had given up on trying to acquire the drive. Instead, he was continuing his plan to develop a new cryptocurrency, which he named Ceiniog Coin.

== Opinion ==
When Howells was interviewed in 2013 about his first visit to the landfill, he stated, "As soon as I saw the site, I thought you've got no chance. The area covered is huge." He later retracted this opinion.

In 2017, Howells believed that the city council would allow him to retrieve the device once it had become sufficiently valuable, saying that "it's just been a waiting game for the past few years … waiting until the bitcoin price was high enough to make the drive a juicy enough treasure to hunt.” In 2021, he stated that "The outside case might be rusted. But the inside disk, where the data is stored – there should be a good chance that it still works." In 2022, he estimated that there was an "80–90 percent chance" that the Bitcoin could be recovered if the hard drive was found and the glass platter was still intact and not shattered. At the same time, he acknowledged that the device was "a needle in a haystack". In 2024, Howells' legal team stated in court that the metaphorical haystack was theoretically "much, much smaller", due to the "considerable expertise" involved in planning an excavation.

One of his investors has described the investment as "very, very high-risk". A UK waste management expert described the weight of even the smaller section identified by Howells as "the equivalent weight of over 82 million hard drives" and also listed "continual waste compaction, heat from decomposing organic matter, methane and other landfill gasses, and toxic leachate seeping through the waste" as "a hostile environment for electronics".

== See also ==
- List of missing treasures
