= The Rise and Rise of Bitcoin =

- Film poster
- Directed by: Nicholas Mross
- Written by: Patrick Lope, Daniel Mross, Nicholas Mross
- Starring: Gavin Andresen, Brian Armstrong, Margaux Avedisian
- Release date: October 10, 2014
- Running time: 96 minutes
- Country: United States
- Language: English

The Rise and Rise of Bitcoin is a 2014 American documentary film directed by Nicholas Mross. The film interviews multiple companies and people that have played important roles in the history expansion of Bitcoin. It first premiered at the Tribeca Film Festival in New York on April 23, 2014. The film was nominated for the “Best International Documentary Film” at the 2014 Zurich Film Festival. The film has a run time of 96 minutes.

The documentary included footage of Gabriel Sukenik, Zach Harvey, Erik Voorhees, Yifu Guo, Gavin Andresen, Brian Armstrong, Fred Ehrsam, Mark Karpeles, Vitalik Buterin, Julian Assange, Tim Berners-Lee, George W. Bush and Ross Ulbricht. The Rise and Rise of Bitcoin's writers were advised by academics and consultants, such as Daniel Mross, Charlie Shrem, Alex Waters, Jered Kenna, Trace Mayer, Andrew Lokenauth, Nicholas Mross and Patrick Lope.

== Synopsis ==
The documentary follows 35-year-old computer programmer Daniel Mross. On top of his job, kids, and marriage, Daniel is an avid enthusiast of the cryptocurrency Bitcoin. He discovered Bitcoin in 2011, and from there he has been fascinated by anything that has to do with it. Daniel and his brother and producer, Nicholas Mross, decided to start filming because they believe that this could really be the future of currency, and filming a documentary is one way to expedite the process. By doing this, they were able to educate anyone who watched this film. Throughout Daniel's journey around the World, he meets the individuals who are leading this potential financial revolution. Daniel and the people that he interviews are the pioneers that are adventuring into this mysterious concept. The future goes to show that not everyone involved in Bitcoin early made it out unscathed.

=== Development ===
Daniel and Nicholas Mross came up with the idea of this documentary due to the difficulty Daniel experienced attempting to explain Bitcoin to his peers. In an interview, Daniel states “And I found in short time it was really difficult to talk to people about Bitcoin if they didn't know what it was or to explain it ... It's not something that, you know, especially earlier on was easy to explain to somebody in 1 or 2 minutes.” This documentary acts as a bridge between those educated in Bitcoin technology and those interested in educating themselves.

== Reception ==
On Rotten Tomatoes, a reviewer aggregate, the film was rated a 67% based on 9 reviews. Those reviews had an average rating of 6.1 out of 10.

The New York Times critiqued the film for its sidestepping of economists' past criticisms of the Bitcoin economy. Variety's Dennis Harvey criticized the film for having an overly positive tone towards Bitcoin, as he felt that the "consistent rah-rah tenor makes Nicholas Mross’ documentary less interesting than it could be, since it shies away from most tough questions to simply chase the enthusiasm demonstrated by Bitcoin supporters."

Common Sense Media rated the movie at 4/5 stars, stating that, "Although viewers may still have questions afterward, the use of animated visuals to explain how Bitcoin transactions work and interviews with some of Bitcoin's earliest users and pioneers provides a basic understanding of the currency's role in today's society."

== See also ==
- Bitcoin network
- Cryptocurrency
