= Courtney Warner =

American actress and film producer

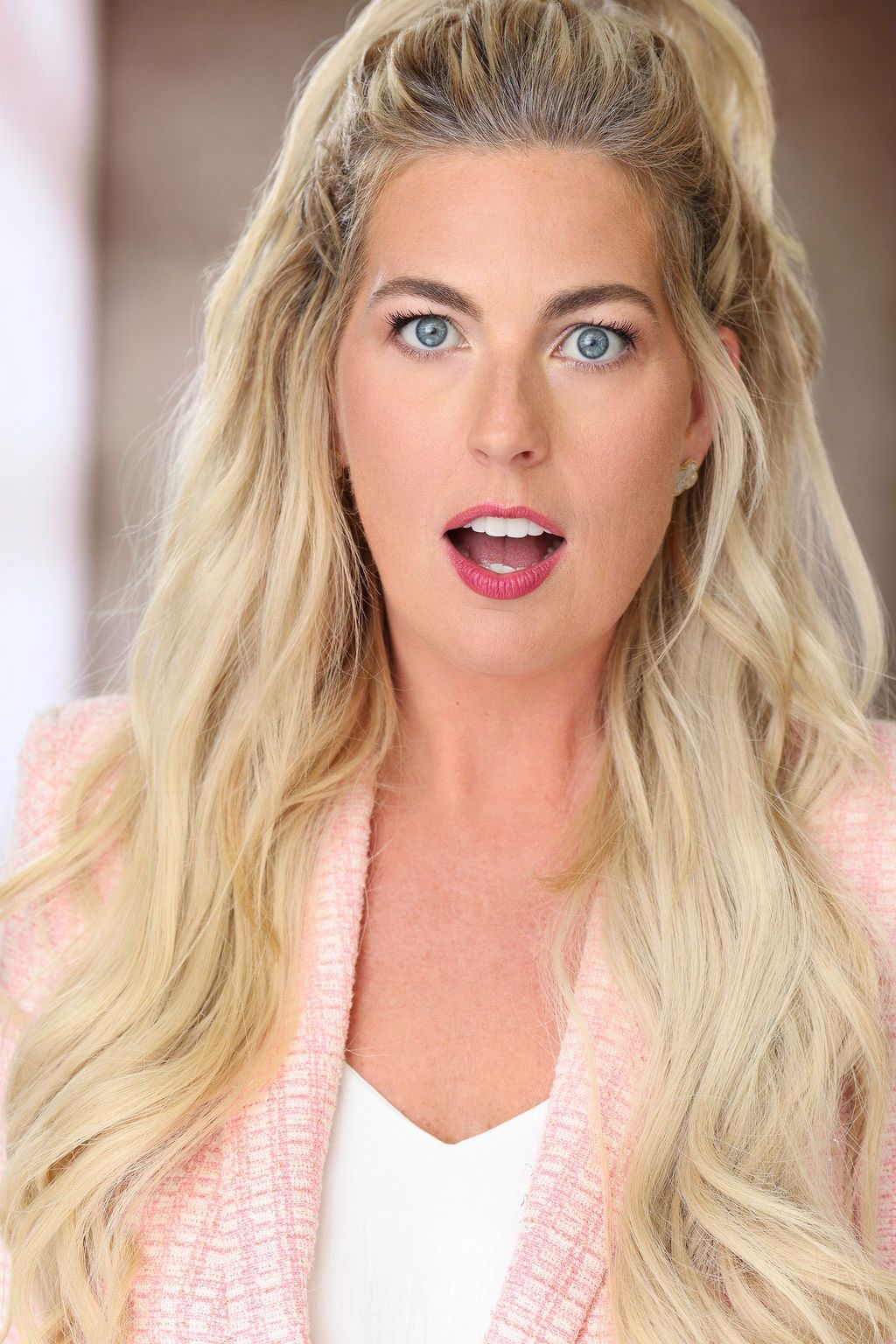
- Warner's Portrait
- Born: York, Pennsylvania, U.S.
- Other name: Courtney Shrem
- Occupations: Actress, film producer
- Years active: 2011-present
- Spouse: Charlie Shrem (m. 2016)

Courtney Warner (also known as Courtney Shrem) is an American actress and film producer. She has appeared in independent films since 2011, including supporting roles in the romantic comedy Ask Me to Dance (2022), which she co-produced, the psychological thriller Trauma Therapy: Psychosis (2023), and the comedy-drama Christmas Eve in Miller's Point (2024). She also appeared in the drama McVeigh (2024) and the thriller Whiskey Run (2025). She is based in the Sarasota-Longboat Key area.

== Early life ==
Warner was born in York, Pennsylvania. She began dancing at age five and moved to New York City in 2002 to pursue dance and modeling. She trained at the Broadway Dance Center and was signed with the McDonald Selznick Agency (MSA).

== Career ==
Warner's early credits include a featured role in the 2011 short film Two Wasted Lives, a role in The Instant Messenger (2011), and the role of Victoria in the thriller The Will (2014), which was filmed in Denmark.

In 2022, she played Amy and served as co-producer on the romantic comedy Ask Me to Dance, directed by and starring Tom Malloy. The film premiered in Sarasota and received generally positive reviews for its lighthearted tone and dance sequences.

She portrayed Lily in the 2023 psychological thriller Trauma Therapy: Psychosis, which featured Tom Sizemore in one of his final roles. Critics noted the film's exploration of unethical therapy methods, with some praising Warner's portrayal of her character's mental deterioration.

In 2024, she appeared as Kylie in the family comedy Love Unleashed, Nancy in Curry Scent, Lori in Dark Night of the Soul, and a stressed woman in the comedy-drama Christmas Eve in Miller's Point, directed by Tyler Taormina, which premiered in the Directors' Fortnight section at the Cannes Film Festival. The latter film received positive reviews for its ensemble cast and nostalgic depiction of family gatherings.

Warner appeared as Karen in the 2024 drama McVeigh, directed by Mike Ott, which premiered at the Tribeca Festival. The film focuses on the life of Timothy McVeigh and received mixed reviews.

In 2025, Warner appeared as Abby Grace in the thriller Whiskey Run, directed by Aaron Mirtes.

== Personal life ==
Warner has been married to cryptocurrency entrepreneur Charlie Shrem since 2016. The couple resides in the Sarasota-Longboat Key area. She has volunteered with the Safe Place and Rape Crisis Center (SPARCC).

== Filmography ==
=== Film ===
Year	Title	Role	Notes
2011	Two Wasted Lives	Featured	
2011	The Instant Messenger	—	
2014	The Will	Victoria	
2022	Ask Me to Dance	Amy	Also producer
2023	Trauma Therapy: Psychosis	Lily	
2024	Love Unleashed	Kylie	
2024	Curry Scent	Nancy	
2024	Dark Night of the Soul	Lori	
2024	Christmas Eve in Miller's Point	Stressed Woman	
2024	McVeigh	Karen	
2025	Whiskey Run	Abby Grace	
