= Erik Voorhees =

American cryptocurrency entrepreneur

Erik Tristan Voorhees
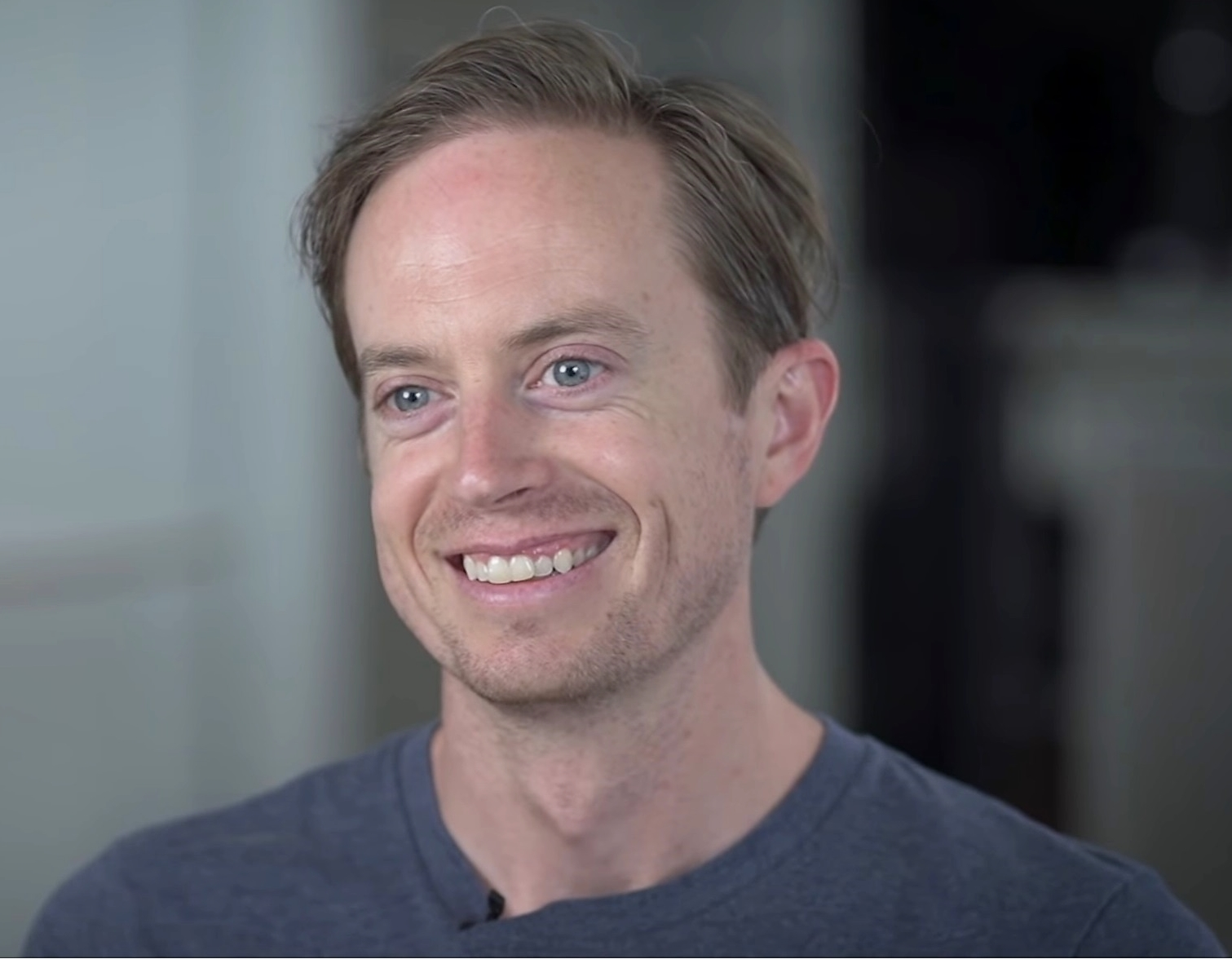
- Voorhees interviewed by Reason TV in 2021
- Born: 1984 (age 41–42); Danbury, Connecticut, U.S.
- Education: University of Puget Sound
- Occupation: Cryptocurrency entrepreneur
- Employer(s): ShapeShift (CEO/Founder); BitInstant (Director of Marketing); Venice AI (Founder)
- Known for: Founder of ShapeShift; co-founder of SatoshiDice; founder of Venice AI
- Movement: Libertarianism; Free State Project

Erik Tristan Voorhees is an American cryptocurrency entrepreneur and founder of the cryptocurrency exchange ShapeShift as well as Venice AI. He also co-founded Satoshi Dice and was the Director of Marketing at BitInstant. He has been referred to as a crypto-libertarian and has advocated for "the separation of money and state." His views have emphasized financial privacy, user sovereignty, and individual liberty.

Voorhees' involvement in the Free State Project—a movement encouraging libertarians to relocate to New Hampshire—played a pivotal role in his early adoption of bitcoin.

During his time in New Hampshire, he actively promoted the use of cryptocurrency as a means of financial independence and resistance to centralized monetary systems. He has also emphasized the potential of Bitcoin and other cryptocurrencies to challenge the monopoly of fiat currencies and foster innovation in global finance.

== Biography ==
Voorhees was born in Danbury, Connecticut in 1984, and was raised in Colorado. In 2003, Voorhees enrolled at the University of Puget Sound, where he became friends with a fellow student named Nicolas Cary, who he would introduce to bitcoin; Cary later founded Blockchain.com. After graduating, Voorhees moved to Dubai, where he worked as a communications manager for a real estate company. Since 2013, he has been living in Panama.

== Cryptocurrency career ==
According to the Wall Street Journal, Voorhees first encountered bitcoin in 2011. His discovery of the Bitcoin coincided with his involvement in the Free State Project, an initiative aimed at recruiting 20,000 libertarians to relocate to New Hampshire.

Voorhees has been described as BitInstant's head of communications, and as BitInstant's director of marketing. He served as BitInstant’s third employee and worked on explaining bitcoin to broader audiences.

In April 2012, Voorhees launched Satoshi Dice, a bitcoin gambling site. Satoshi Dice would at one point in time account for half of all Bitcoin transaction volume. In 2013, he sold Satoshi Dice for $11.5 million worth of bitcoin. In 2014, Voorhees paid $50,000 to the SEC to settle an investigation into allegations of selling unregistered securities, associated with his sale of shares of SatoshiDice.

In July 2014, Voorhees launched ShapeShift, a digital currency exchange, in Switzerland, as a response to the downfall of the Mt. Gox exchange. In 2014, an interview with him was included in the documentary The Rise and Rise of Bitcoin. In 2017 he stated he supported Segwit2x in the regards to the bitcoin scalability problem. ShapeShift, unlike many exchanges, did not require user identification, allowing for anonymous transactions. This lack of oversight enabled criminals, including North Korean hackers and Ponzi scheme operators, to launder nearly $90 million in criminal proceeds, with ShapeShift processing the largest portion of these funds among exchanges with U.S. presence. ShapeShift's policy facilitated the conversion of traceable cryptocurrencies like Bitcoin into untraceable ones like Monero, effectively obscuring the money trail.

In 2018, Erik Voorhees was implicated in an SEC investigation into a $50 million cryptocurrency sale by Salt Lending Holdings Inc., where he was involved in fundraising. WSJ stated, that the SEC had been analysing whether Salt's token sale should have been registered as a securities offering and if it had violated a 2014 settlement banning Voorhees from such fundraising. As it was stated in a previous WSJ significant investigation on Voorhees, ShapeShift, run by Voorhees, has been used by criminals to launder money, leading to law enforcement scrutiny and Voorhees has previously settled with the SEC for conducting an illegal stock offering for an internet gambling company, and his involvement with Salt's private offering raises legal concerns regarding his compliance with SEC regulations.

In 2022, Voorhees was quoted in media in opposition to financial surveillance, in relating to a public spat he had with Sam Bankman-Fried, as SBF was promoting regulation of the crypto industry and Voorhees was opposed to it.
