= Kittitian and Nevisian nationality law =

Saint Christopher and Nevis Citizenship Act

National Assembly
- Long title: An Act to provide for the acquisition, deprivation, and renunciation of citizenship of Saint Christopher and Nevis; and to provide for related or incidental matters.
- Citation: No. 1 of 1984
- Territorial extent: Saint Kitts and Nevis
- Enacted by: National Assembly
- Enacted: 28 February 1984
- Commenced: 28 February 1984
- Status: Amended

The primary law governing Saint Kitts and Nevis nationality regulations is the Saint Christopher and Nevis Citizenship Act, which came into force on 28 February 1984.

Saint Kitts and Nevis is a member state of the Organisation of Eastern Caribbean States (OECS). Kittian and Nevisian nationals have automatic and permanent permission to live and work in any other OECS country.

With few exceptions, almost all individuals born in Saint Kitts and Nevis are automatically citizens at birth. Foreign nationals may become citizens by naturalisation after living in the country for at least 14 years and fulfilling a good character requirement. Individuals who make a substantial financial contribution to the state are eligible for a facilitated naturalisation with no required period of residence.

Saint Kitts and Nevis was previously a colony of the British Empire and local residents were British subjects. Although Saint Kitts and Nevis gained independence in 1983 and citizens no longer hold British nationality, they continue to have favoured status when residing in the United Kingdom; as Commonwealth citizens, they are eligible to vote in UK elections and serve in public office there.

== Terminology ==
Nationality establishes one's international identity as a member of a sovereign nation. Though it is not synonymous with citizenship, for rights granted under domestic law for domestic purposes, the United Kingdom, and thus the commonwealth, have traditionally used the words interchangeably.

== Acquiring Kittitian and Nevisian nationality ==
Kittitians and Nevisians may acquire nationality through adoption, birth, naturalisation, or registration.

=== By birth ===
Birthright nationality applies to:

- Persons born within the territory, except those who are born to persons like foreign diplomats, who have immunity from legal processes, or to foreign parents whose country is at war with the Kittitian and Nevisian sovereign;
- Persons born abroad to at least one parent, who is Kittitian and Nevisian, or parents who would have acquired such nationality had the parent not died prior to independence;
- Foundlings; or
- Persons born aboard a ship or aircraft which is registered in Saint Kitts and Nevis or a ship or aircraft which may be unregistered but owned by the government of Saint Kitts and Nevis.

=== By registration ===
Nationality by registration includes those who have familial or historic relationship affiliations with Saint Kitts, Nevis, or Anguilla. It also includes a programme to acquire nationality through investment. Persons who can acquire nationality by registration include:

==== By affiliation ====
- Persons who were the wife or widow of a national who acquired nationality at the time of independence, or would have acquired nationality except for the death of the spouse;
- Post-independence, the spouse of a national;
- Persons who were born abroad before 1 January 1983, to at least one parent who was a Kittitian and Nevisian national at the time of birth, or to Kittitian and Nevisian parents or grandparents who would have acquired such nationality had they not died prior to independence;
- Persons who are nationals of a Commonwealth country, who have become residents of Saint Kitts and Nevis and resided in the territory or worked for the government for at least fourteen years; or
- Minors under the age of majority who are legally adopted by a national at the issuance of an adoption order.

==== By investment ====
The program for acquiring citizenship through investment in Saint Kitts and Nevis is the oldest such program in the world, having been launched in 1984.

Persons seeking citizenship through investment must meet the following requirements;

The primary applicant must be 18 years of age or older. Applicants must make a minimum investment in either approved real estate; or a donation, known as the Sustainable Island State Contribution (SISC) into the Federal Consolidated Fund; or a donation to an Approved Public Benefactor. The minimum real estate investment is US$400,000. The minimum donation contribution is US$250,000.00 for a single applicant and US$350,000.00 for a family of four. Applicants must also pay non-refundable application and due diligence fees, provide the required documentation for adequate background, police, and due diligence checks, provide the required financial disclosure information, and complete an interview.

Government-approved agents are responsible for assisting applicants and submitting their applications to the Citizenship by Investment Unit for review. Once an application is successfully approved, applicants must make the specified monetary investment within three months in order to be granted citizenship.

=== By naturalisation ===
Ordinary naturalisation in Saint Kitts and Nevis can be obtained by adult persons of legal capacity, who in the 12 months prior to submitting an application resided in the territory, are of good character, and intend to be a resident of Saint Kitts and Nevis. Applicants petition the Minister responsible for immigration, who considers whether the applicant has resided within the territory for fourteen years and poses no threat to national security or public order. Upon approval, applicants must take an Oath of Allegiance.

== Loss of nationality ==
Nationals may voluntarily renounce their affiliation with Saint Kitts and Nevis, if the declarant is a legal adult and is able to acquire other nationality, eliminating the prospect of statelessness within twelve months. Renunciation may not be accepted if Saint Kitts and Nevis is at war with the proposed new source of nationality, or such renunciation would pose a threat to the nation. Denaturalisation may occur if a person obtained nationality through fraud, false representation, or concealment; if they have committed acts of treason; if they have committed acts of disloyalty or service to a foreign government; if they are found guilty of certain criminal offences; if they lose their nationality in another Commonwealth country; and in the case of nationality by investment for failure to meet requirements of the program.

== Dual nationality ==
Dual nationality has been permitted in Saint Kitts and Nevis from independence.

== History ==
=== Spanish and French colonial period (1493–1625) ===
Spain claimed St. Jorge's and San Martín Islands (Note: Columbus' biographer, Samuel Eliot Morison, wrote that the initial name of Saint Kitts was St. Jorge's; Italian historian Pietro Martire d'Anghiera recorded the name as Sancta Maria Antigua; and Ferdinand Columbus, the son of the explorer, gave the name as St. Marie la Antigua. On maps from 1500, Saint Kitts was designated as La Gorda.) from 1493, but by the sixteenth century the original names given the islands were replaced on Spanish maps as San Cristóbal and Nieves, respectively. Anguilla's date of discovery by Europeans is unknown, but it appeared on a map from 1523. Over the next century, there were a few attempts to settle the islands by the Spanish and French, but no permanent settlements were made. Primarily the islands of the Lesser Antilles were used as waystations to replenish food, water, and wood supplies for Dutch, English, French, and Spanish sailors. In 1620, Ralph Merifield and Thomas Warner secured a Royal Patent from King James VI and I to establish trading centers and proprietary colonies in the islands of Saint Christopher, Nevis, Barbados, and Montserrat. Warner, who had been living in the failed North Colony of The Guianas, and was returning home to England, landed on Saint Kitts, and thought that it had a suitable environment to grow tobacco. In 1624, he arrived on Saint Kitts with less than two dozen settlers to find three French inhabitants living with the native Kalinago people. The following year, a French ship, under the command of Pierre Belain d'Esnambuc, arrived on the island with 80 sailors with the intention of harboring to repair their damaged ship. Alarmed by the arrival of so many Europeans, the Kalinago put up a fight, but were defeated when the English and French joined forces against them. Both Warner and d'Esnambuc returned to their respective homelands and received commissions to establish settlements on the island. (Note: James I died in 1625 and Warner had returned to England to gain official sanction for his colony. Charles I changed the granting of proprietorships so that they could only be awarded to members of the peerage. Thus, Warner received a commission in 1625 to serve as the administrator, under royal protection and the proprietorship was not sorted until 1627, when it was awarded to James Hay, 1st Earl of Carlisle.)

=== British and French joint period (1625–1713) ===
In Britain, allegiance, in which subjects pledged to support a monarch, was the precursor to the modern concept of nationality. The crown recognized from 1350 that all persons born within the territories of the British Empire were subjects. Those born outside the realm — except children of those serving in an official post abroad, children of the monarch, and children born on a British sailing vessel — were considered by common law to be foreigners. Marriage did not affect the status of a subject of the realm. Similarly, the Ancien Régime of France developed a system of feudal allegiance in which subjects were bound together by a scheme of protection and service tied to land ownership. Possession of land was typically tied to military and court service and omitted women because they could not perform those obligations. Thus, French nationality also derived from place of birth in French territory, until the nineteenth century, but under feudal law married women were subjugated to the authority of their husbands under coverture.

Warner returned to Saint Kitts in 1625 with 100 new British colonists and in 1627, d'Esnambuc returned with several hundred French settlers. Within five days of his arrival, he and Warner drew up a pact to divide the island. The French settled in the coastal regions and the English occupied the center of the island, calling their colonies St. Christophe and Saint Christopher (Saint Kitts), respectively. In 1628, Anthony Hilton, a colonist on Saint Kitts, established a settlement on Nevis, which attracted interest from others settled on Saint Kitts, who began migrating to the nearby island. Sugar was introduced to the islands in 1640 and by 1650 had become the main staple crop. Along with sugar's introduction, importation of slaves increased and a plantation society developed. In 1650, another contingent of settlers from Saint Kitts ventured to Anguilla to colonize it and in 1660, a sole governor was assigned for Saint Kitts and Anguilla, when proprietary rule ended and the colonies were taken over by the crown. The Second Anglo-Dutch War resulted in the British expulsion from the islands in 1666, but at the war's conclusion in 1667, terms of the Treaty of Breda returned all colonies to their former owners. By the 1670s, the French colony of St. Christophe numbered 3,600 settlers with 4,500 slaves compared to the British colony of Saint Kitts, which had less than 1,000 settlers with around 900 slaves. The French crown took control of St. Christophe colony in 1674, when the proprietors went bankrupt. By 1680, St. Christophe had only 130 planters left, whereas the population of Saint Kitts included 3,000 colonists and 4,300 slaves, Nevis had 3,500 colonists with 5,000 slaves, and Anguilla had 500 inhabitants with no slaves.

The French Empire created separate codes for the colonies and the motherland, resulting in little global standardization of French law. Numerous colonial laws issued from 1550 governed the French Antilles until the Code Noir was decreed by Louis XIV in 1685. The Code was designed to control the social relations between blacks and whites in the Caribbean and contained provisions for naturalization of freed persons. Producing illegitimate children with slaves carried heavy penalties; however, marrying a slave woman in a church automatically manumitted her and any offspring the marriage. Children followed the status of the mother, regardless of the father's status, thus if she was a slave her children were slaves and if she was free her children were free. Unlike France, the British did not have a single overarching slave code. Each British colony was allowed to establish its own rules about the slave trade, and a code was established for Saint Kitts in 1711. These laws were structured to maintain social hierarchies by regulating familial matters, like who could marry, legitimacy, and inheritance.

In 1689, during the Nine Years' War the French and British colonies were involved in the conflict and settlers were evacuated from both Saint Kitts and Anguilla to Nevis. In 1690, British forces recaptured Saint Kitts and the French surrender included their retreat from Anguilla as well. The signing of the Treaty of Ryswick in 1697 ended the hostilities between Britain and France, but the British governor, Christopher Codrington, delayed the return of Captured properties to French planters. He subsequently died and was succeeded by his son, also Christopher, as governor, who followed the same tactic of delay. The French claims were still unsettled in 1701, and with the outbreak of the War of the Spanish Succession conflict emerged again. Codrington II approached the French governor Jean-Baptiste de Gennes and demanded his surrender, which was given in July 1702. France launched an offensive to retake the islands in 1706, but was ultimately defeated and Britain gained sole control of the islands under provisions of the Peace of Utrecht signed in 1713.

=== British colony (1713–1983) ===
Other than common law, there was no standard statutory law which applied for subjects throughout the realm, meaning different jurisdictions created their own legislation for local conditions, which often conflicted with the laws in other jurisdictions in the empire. (Note: Legislation passed in Saint Kitts in 1830 granted equal rights to specific free colored men by name, rather than extending rights to all freedmen. The law allowed other individuals to petition for the same privilege, but was intended as a measure to decrease community empowerment and solidarity.) Nationality laws passed by the British Parliament were extended only to the Kingdom of Great Britain, and later the United Kingdom of Great Britain and Ireland. By 1734, the independence of Saint Kitts and Nevis had been well established and both had a Legislative Council. Anguilla had a thirteen-member vestry which administered island affairs. Increasing absenteeism by plantation owners led to a decline in community spirit and a weakening of the caliber of men administrating the governance of the islands. In 1807, the British Parliament passed the Slave Trade Act, barring the Atlantic slave trade in the empire. The British government continued to have little involvement in colonial affairs, but in 1816 appointed Thomas Probyn to act as the Captain-General and Commander in Chief for the colonies of Anguilla, Nevis, Saint Kitts, and the Virgin Islands. In 1825, the British government decided despite local objection, that Anguilla's vestry should be dissolved and the island would be annexed to Saint Kitts for administrative purposes. In 1832, they established the British Leeward Islands colony, joining Anguilla, Antigua, Barbuda, Montserrat, Nevis, Saint Kitts, and the Virgin Islands into a single administrative unit overseen by a Governor located in Antigua.

The Slave Act had not abolished slavery, which did not end until the 1833 Emancipation Act went into effect in 1834. Under its terms, slaves were converted into apprentices and remained bound to their former owners for four years if they had worked in the home and for six years if they had been field labourers. In 1838, a bill was passed in Charlestown, Nevis ending the apprenticeship system on all three islands. Though free, there was never a British plan to give former slaves a voice in Parliament, leaving them as British subjects in a highly stratified system of rights. Denied political and economic rights, former slaves were not entitled to formal recognition as nationals by other nations. In 1867, the vestry of Anguilla was reestablished, but during another reshuffling in 1871, the British government created the Federal Colony of the Leeward Islands which united the separate islands, known as presidencies, under a federal system. Anguilla requested having its own presidency, like Saint Kitts and Nevis were given, but it remained tied to Saint Kitts as a single unit, though it was allowed to have a representative in the Legislative Council of Saint Kitts. In 1878, both Saint Kitts (including Anguilla) and Nevis were made crown colonies, transferring the administration of the islands to the crown. Then in 1883, Saint Kitts (which included Anguilla) and Nevis were joined into a single united colony, with one Legislative Council located on Saint Kitts. Anguilla's vestry was abolished again, it was denied representation in the Council, and it was not part of the legal name of the colony, which was styled as Saint Christopher-Nevis.

In 1911, at the Imperial Conference a decision was made to draft a common nationality code for use across the empire. The British Nationality and Status of Aliens Act 1914 allowed local jurisdictions in the self-governing Dominions to continue regulating nationality in their territories, but also established an imperial nationality scheme throughout the realm. The uniform law, which went into effect on 1 January 1915, required a married woman to derive her nationality from her spouse, meaning if he was British, she was also, and if he was foreign, so was she. It stipulated that upon loss of nationality of a husband, a wife could declare that she wished to remain British and provided that if a marriage had terminated, through death or divorce, a British-born national who had lost her status through marriage could reacquire British nationality through naturalisation without meeting a residency requirement. The statute reiterated common law provisions for natural-born persons born within the realm on or after the effective date. By using the word person, the statute nullified legitimacy requirements for jus soli nationals. For those born abroad on or after the effective date, legitimacy was still required, and could only be derived by a child from a British father (one generation), who was natural-born or naturalised. Naturalisations required five years residence or service to the crown.

Amendments to the British Nationality Act were enacted in 1918, 1922, 1933 and 1943 changing derivative nationality by descent and modifying slightly provisions for women to lose their nationality upon marriage. Because of a rise in statelessness, a woman who did not automatically acquire her husband's nationality upon marriage or upon his naturalisation in another country, did not lose their British status after 1933. The 1943 revision allowed a child born abroad at any time to be a British national by descent if the Secretary of State agreed to register the birth. Under the terms of the British Nationality Act 1948 British nationals in Saint Christopher-Nevis were reclassified at that time as "Citizens of the UK and Colonies" (CUKC). The basic British nationality scheme did not change overmuch, and typically those who were previously defined as British remained the same. Changes included that wives and children no longer automatically acquired the status of the husband or father, children who acquired nationality by descent no longer were required to make a retention declaration, and registrations for children born abroad were extended.

In 1951, Anguilla was affixed to the legal name of the colony, which became Saint Christopher-Nevis-Anguilla. In 1958, the colony joined the West Indies Federation. The federation, which included Barbados, the British Leeward Islands, the British Windward Islands, Jamaica, and Trinidad and Tobago, was typically seen by its supporters as a means to use a federal structure to gain national independence and eventual recognition as a Dominion. The federation was unable to develop a unified nationality scheme, as member states tended to identify with their specific island, rather than by region. The federation collapsed in 1962, but in 1967, Saint Christopher-Nevis-Anguilla became an Associated State, under the West Indies Act of that year. Under the terms of the Act, Associated States – Antigua, Dominica, Grenada, Saint Christopher-Nevis-Anguilla, Saint Lucia, and Saint Vincent – were on a trajectory to become fully independent and could terminate their association upon becoming an independent Commonwealth country. Under the terms of the statehood agreement, each island was to obtain its own Local Council, which would be responsible for minor local issues like animal control, cemetery maintenance, and street cleaning. All internal affairs were to be handled by the state's Legislative Council and Britain had authority over external affairs. Anguilla refused to participate in statehood citing a lengthy list of grievances and neglect under the previous union with Saint Kitts and Nevis. Though legally it would remain part of the other two islands until 1980, in effect it separated from them in 1967. In 1980, the Anguilla Act 1980, rendered it a separate, dependent colony. The Constitution developed at that time provided that any person who had been born, resided, was registered or naturalised as a CUKC in Saint Kitts and Nevis before 19 December 1980, would on that date become a CUKC in Anguilla.

In 1981 a new British Nationality Act was drafted, which went into force on 1 January 1983. Under its terms, nationals who had formerly been recognized as CUKCs were divided into three groups: those who had established the right of abode in the United Kingdom and were UK nationals; those who were nationals of British Dependent Territories, formerly British colonies; and those who remained British, but were nationals of British Overseas countries which were independent. Thus, anyone who was a CUKC in Anguilla or Saint Kitts and Nevis who had been born, registered, or naturalised in those territories, or whose parent or grandparent had been a CUKC of those territories, became a British national with the status of British Dependent Territories Citizen (BTDC). Others who became BTDCs upon the effective date were: women who were CUKCs who had been married at any time to a person who became, or would have become except for death, BTDCs; stateless persons who were registered as CUKCs whose mothers became, or would have become except for death, BTDCs; minor children whose parent became, or would have become except for death, BTDCs; and people who were CUKCs by virtue of their country being annexed and had been defined as British subjects under the pre-1949 definition. The 1981 Act also eliminated gender disparities on who could derive nationality from a parent or spouse.

=== Post-independence (1983–present) ===
On 19 September 1983, the Federation of Saint Christopher and Nevis, which was also authorized by virtue of the constitution to be written as the Federation of Saint Kitts and Nevis, gained its independence. Generally, persons who had right of abode in the United Kingdom remained British nationals and those who previously been British nationals or held the classification of nationals as defined under the classification of "British Dependent Territories Citizen", who were adopted, born, married to, naturalised, or registered in Saint Kitts and Nevis would become nationals of Saint Kitts and Nevis on Independence Day and cease to be BTDCs. Other provisions attempted to include any person who had BTDC or British nationality with ties to Saint Kitts and Nevis, such as persons born in Anguilla who were ordinary residents of Saint Kitts and Nevis since 1980; those who held "Belonger" status, and minor children of anyone who would acquire nationality of Saint Kitts and Nevis at independence. The 1983 Constitution contained a provision allowing Nevis to secede from the federation through referendum. Subsequent to independence, the legislature passed the Saint Kitts and Nevis Citizenship Act of 1984. Nevis attempted to secede in 1998, but the referendum fell short of the two-thirds majority required.
