= Bitstamp =

Bitcoin exchange based in the UK

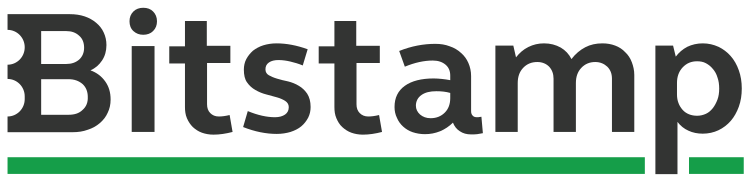
- Type: Cryptocurrency Exchange
- Location: Luxembourg City, Luxembourg
- Founded: 2011; 15 years ago
- Owner: Robinhood
- Key people: Jean-Baptiste Graftieaux (CEO); Nejc Kodrič (co-founder); Damian Merlak (co-founder)
- Website: www.bitstamp.net

Bitstamp logo (2013–2017)

Bitstamp is a Luxembourg-based cryptocurrency exchange founded in 2011. Considered the world’s longest-running cryptocurrency exchange, its business operations are conducted from its registered headquarters in Luxembourg City, with a satellite office in Ljubljana.

== History ==
Bitstamp was founded as a European-focused alternative to then-dominant bitcoin exchange Mt. Gox. While the firm trades in US dollars, it accepts fiat money deposits for free only via the European Union's Single Euro Payments Area, a mechanism for transferring money between European bank accounts.

Nejc Kodrič, a widely known member of the bitcoin community, co-founded the company in August 2011 with Damijan Merlak in his native Slovenia, but later moved its registration to the UK in April 2013, then to Luxembourg in 2016. (Note: The firm is registered in Reading in the UK, but this is in fact just the offices of UK PLC, a company specialising in company formation and which, amongst its services, allows companies to use its own address as their registered office, effectively acting as a forwarding address. There is no clear information available as to where Bitstamp's operations are located or whether they actually have any presence at all in the UK, or are still run out of Slovenia.) Bitstamp outsourced certain operations to the UK due to the lack of adequate financial and legal services in Slovenia. It was backed by the United States hedge fund Pantera Capital.

In September 2013, the company began requiring account holders to verify their identity with copies of their passports and official records of their home address.

In April 2016, the Luxembourgish government granted a license to Bitstamp to be fully regulated in the EU as a payment institution, allowing it to do business in all 28 EU member states. In August 2017, Bitstamp added trading of Ether to the company’s platform.

In October 2018, a Belgian investment company acquired Bitstamp in an all cash deal. In September 2023, three months after Ripple purchased a stake from the firm for an undisclosed amount, Bitstamp temporarily suspended the Ethereum staking service due to regulatory concerns.

In 2024, Robinhood Markets announced that it had moved to acquire the firm for $200 million.

Robinhood completed the acquisition on 2 June 2025 for approximately $200 million in cash, after which the exchange began operating under the name "Bitstamp by Robinhood". At the time of the deal, Bitstamp held more than 50 licenses and registrations worldwide and served over 500,000 funded retail and about 5,000 institutional customers, giving Robinhood its first institutional crypto business.

== Service disruptions ==
In February 2014, the company suspended withdrawals for several days in the face of a distributed denial-of-service. Bitcoin Magazine reported that people behind the attack sent a ransom demand of 75 bitcoins to Kodrič, who refused due to a company policy against negotiating with “terrorists”.

In January 2015, Bitstamp suspended its service after a hack during which less than 19,000 bitcoins were stolen, reopening nearly a week later.

== Compliance ==
In September 2018 the New York Attorney General office produced a 42-page "Virtual Markets Integrity Initiative Report", after requesting fourteen virtual currency exchanges to participate in a survey. The report aimed to create greater transparency regarding security, anti-hacking measures and business practices. Bitstamp was among ten platforms that responded; it is noted that of these ten, Bitstamp was among the seven that confirmed that they had sought approval, directly or through a subsidiary, from the New York State Department of Financial Services (“DFS”) to operate a virtual currency business in New York State. The report goes on to say that such approval implies an agreement to actively protect deposited funds, prevent money laundering and illegal activity, and respond to other risks. Bitstamp was one of two exchanges that claimed to block access to their exchange by VPNs. In addition to providing fee policies, Bitstamp also claimed to conduct audits of their virtual currency holdings.
