= Gavin Andresen =

US-based software developer

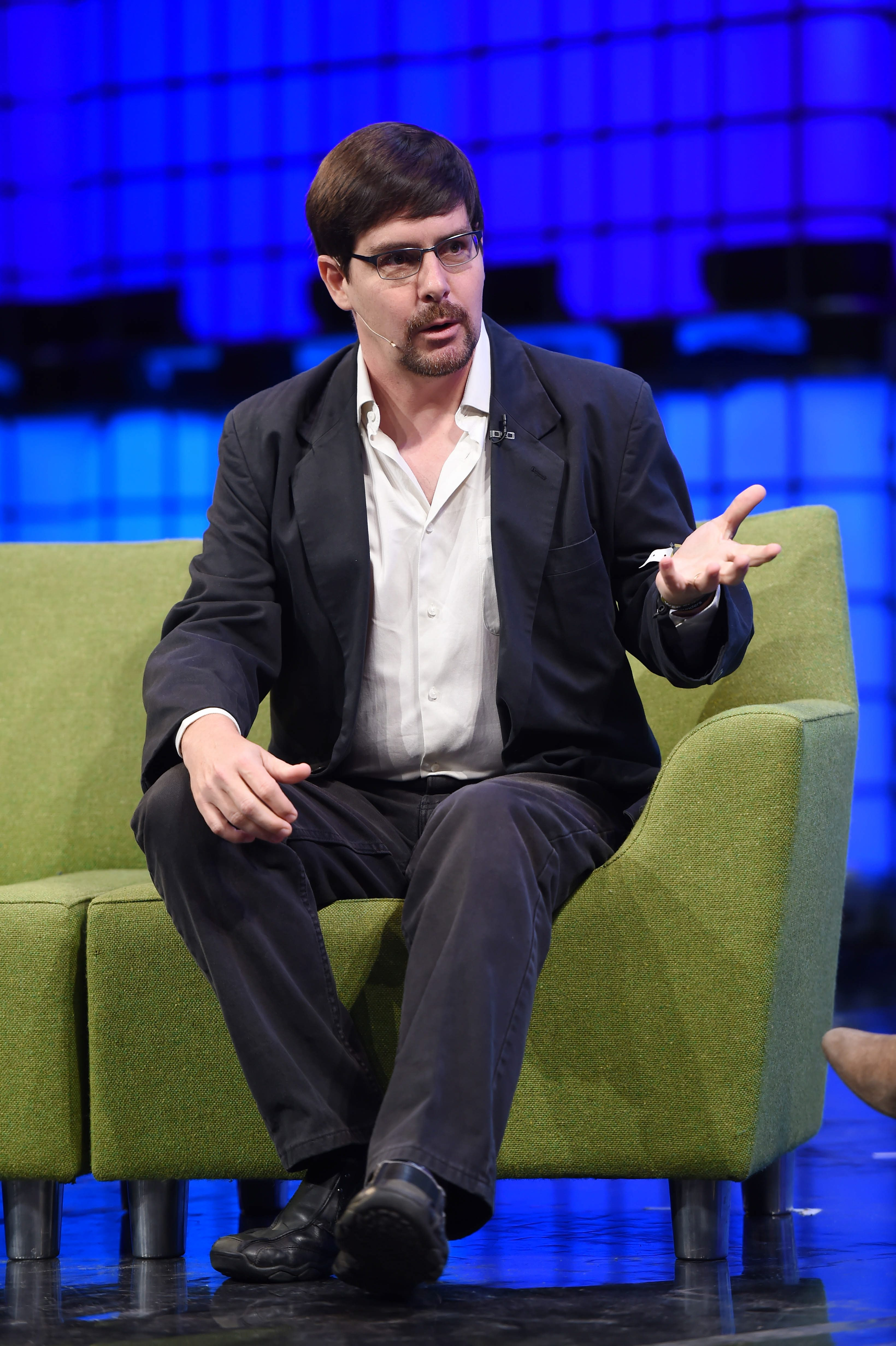
- Andresen speaking at the 2014 Web Summit
- Born: November 11, 1966 (age 59)
- Other name: Gavin Bell
- Education: Princeton University
- Known for: Bitcoin, software
- Scientific career
- Fields: Computer science
- Website: gavinandresen.ninja

Gavin Andresen (formerly Gavin Bell, born November 11, 1966) is a software developer known for his involvement with bitcoin.

Originally a developer of 3D graphics and virtual reality software, Andresen became involved in developing products for the bitcoin market in 2010 and was declared by himself as the lead developer of the reference implementation for bitcoin client software after Satoshi Nakamoto departed silently. In 2012, Andresen founded the Bitcoin Foundation, and by 2014, left his software development role to concentrate on the Foundation.

== Career ==
=== 1988-2010s: First projects ===
Andresen (at the time Bell) graduated from Princeton University in 1988. He began his career working on 3D graphics software at Silicon Graphics Computer Systems. In 1996, he co-authored the VRML 2.0 specification, and later published a reference manual for VRML 2.0.

Andresen also created ClearCoin, an escrow-type of service, which was closed in June 2011.

=== 2010-2016: Joining bitcoin ===
Andresen was the lead developer for a part of the bitcoin digital currency project, working to create a secure, stable "cash for the Internet." Andresen first encountered bitcoin in 2010, considering its design to be brilliant. Soon after he created a website named The Bitcoin Faucet which gave away bitcoin. According to Business Insider, he was "credited with setting up the first crypto faucet in 2010," with his bitcoin faucet giving away 5 BTC per person on a first-come, first-served basis. While the amount was initially negligible, in 2026, that amount was worth around half a million dollars. In April 2011, Forbes quoted Andresen as saying, "Bitcoin is designed to bring us back to a decentralized currency of the people," and "this is like better gold than gold."

After joining the developers contributing to bitcoin along with Satoshi Nakamoto, he went on to become lead developer of the client software for the bitcoin network. Andresen had been contributing code to the bitcoin project for four months, when Nakamoto gave him direct access to the source code. In September 2010, Nakamoto told Andresen he was working on other projects, and over the next few months, he gave Andresen control of the SourceForge code repository, and the project's "alert key" as well. Andresen effectively became the open-source project's head developer, guiding a team of five other volunteer programmers. In December 2010, Nakamoto stopped posting online and left Andresen in control of the bitcoin code, with Nakamoto's identity still unknown.

In June 2011, he attended a "conference on emerging technologies for US intelligence agencies" held by In-Q-Tel to present on bitcoin. In 2012, Andresen founded the Bitcoin Foundation to support the currency's development. In 2014, he stepped back as lead bitcoin maintainer and lead developer of bitcoin to focus on the Bitcoin Foundation. In 2015, Andresen joined the Digital Currency Initiative (DCI) at MIT in a full-time role.

=== 2016-present: Leaving bitcoin and afterwards ===
In May 2016 Andresen supported Australian programmer and entrepreneur Craig Wright in a claim to be Nakamoto; Wright's claim was then discredited. The Guardian reported in May 2016 that Andresen was then fired as the Bitcoin Foundation's chief scientist for supporting Wright's claim. His ability to make changes to the main code running bitcoin was revoked, and his role reduced to being "largely ceremonial." Wladimir van der Laan stated to the press that because Andresen had previously stated "Satoshi can have write access to the github repo any time he asks," that the organization was worried he might give the repository to a scammer. Andresen expressed regret getting involved in the "'who was Satoshi' game", and stated "it was a mistake to trust Craig Wright."

Andresen's commit access to Bitcoin Core on GitHub was revoked in May 2016 after stating Wright was Satoshi Nakamoto.

He had become critical of the failure of bitcoin developers to increase network capacity, and helped put together Bitcoin XT as alternative software.

In November 2017, Andresen expressed support for rival currency Bitcoin Cash, stating "Bitcoin Cash is what I started working on in 2010, a store of value AND means of exchange". In 2021, Entrepreneur estimated his personal net worth at $100 million, with Andresen included at #50 on its Crypto Rich List.

== Personal life ==
He is based in Amherst, Massachusetts.
