= Nathaniel Popper =

American journalist

Nathaniel Popper is a journalist for Bloomberg News covering finance and technology from San Francisco. He previously worked for The New York Times, Los Angeles Times,The Forward, Let’s Go Travel Guides and The Boston Globe. He studied history and literature at Harvard University, where he also played Junior Varsity Hockey.

Popper became interested in Bitcoin when he wrote an article that revealed how the Winklevoss twins, Cameron and Tyler Winklevoss, had amassed a large stockpile of Bitcoins. He then spent much of his time researching the origins of Bitcoin. In 2015, he wrote Digital Gold: Bitcoin and the Inside Story of the Misfits and Millionaires Trying to Reinvent Money, a book that includes the story of early Bitcoin supporters. The book was a finalist for the 2015 Financial Times Business Book of the Year Award.

While based in New York, Popper was responsible for covering Wall Street banks like Goldman Sachs, JPMorgan Chase and Morgan Stanley. After moving to the San Francisco Bay Area, he began writing about financial technology firms such as Social Finance, Credit Karma and Square, along with continuing to cover Bitcoin, Ethereum and the blockchain. Popper lives in Oakland, California, with his wife and two sons.
