= Bitcoin Foundation =

Defunct U.S. corporation

The Bitcoin Foundation, Inc.
- Formation: September 2012
- Registration no.: 46-1671796
- Legal status: 501(c)(6) tax-exempt organization (revoked)
- Headquarters: Washington, D.C., U.S.

The Bitcoin Foundation was an American organization formerly registered as a nonprofit corporation.

It was founded in September 2012 to help restore the reputation of Bitcoin after several scandals and to promote its development and adoption. The organization was modeled on the Linux Foundation and funded primarily through grants made by bitcoin-dependent companies.

== History ==
The foundation was established after Bitcoin had gained a reputation for criminality and fraud. The founding chairman was Peter Vessenes.

Former lead Bitcoin developer Gavin Andresen was hired as chief scientist.

In June 2013, the foundation received a letter from the California Department of Financial Institutions ordering it to cease operating as an unlicensed money transmitter.

In November 2013, general counsel Patrick Murck testified before a U.S. Senate committee on digital currencies, receiving a generally positive reception from lawmakers.

=== 2014 scandals and resignations ===
In January 2014, vice-chairman Charlie Shrem was arrested for aiding an unlicensed money-transmitting business linked to the Silk Road marketplace. He resigned and later pled guilty.

In February 2014, Mark Karpelès, CEO of Mt. Gox, resigned after the exchange lost 750,000 customer bitcoins and went bankrupt. Executive chairman Peter Vessenes’ business ties to Karpelès were criticized.

In March 2014, the foundation hired Jim Harper of the Cato Institute as global policy counsel and retained Amy Weiss as a media consultant.

In July 2014, the foundation hired Thorsen French Advocacy as a lobbying firm. Libertarian Bitcoin activists criticized the organization’s increasing political engagement.

=== Board turmoil ===
In May 2014, Bobby Lee (BTCC) and venture capitalist Brock Pierce were appointed to the board.

Ten members resigned due to longstanding allegations against Pierce. Another nine resigned after the May elections, citing dissatisfaction with the foundation’s direction.

=== Financial collapse and leadership changes ===
In April 2015, Bruce Fenton became executive director. He was succeeded by Llew Claasen in July 2016.

In July 2015, Olivier Janssens publicly revealed that the foundation was nearly insolvent, leading to staff layoffs.

== Revocation of tax-exempt status ==
The Bitcoin Foundation’s 501(c)(6) status was officially revoked by the IRS on 15 May 2022.

== Domain name sale ==
The Bitcoin Foundation, Inc.'s historical domain name, bitcoinfoundation.org was sold by Brock Pierce for $78,500 on Namecheap to an unknown entity that is using the domain name for SEO purposes.
