= Ajay Agrawal =

Canadian economist

- Born: Vancouver, British Columbia, Canada

Academic background
- Education: University of British Columbia

Academic work
- Doctoral students: Christian Catalini
- Notable ideas: Founder of Creative Destruction Lab
- Website: agrawal.ca

Ajay K. Agrawal CM works at the University of Toronto's Rotman School of Management as the Geoffrey Taber Chair in Entrepreneurship and Innovation as well as the Professor of Strategic Management.

Agrawal co-founded NEXT Canada, previously The Next 36 in 2010. He founded the Creative Destruction Lab in 2012 at the University of Toronto. Agrawal is co-founder of an annual conference, held at the University of Toronto, "Machine Learning and the Market for Intelligence." Agrawal is a co-author of the books Power and Prediction: The Disruptive Economics of Artificial Intelligence (released in 2022), and Prediction Machines: The Simple Economics of Artificial Intelligence (released in April 2018).

== Career ==
=== Rotman School of Management ===
In 2003, Agrawal joined the Rotman School of Management at the University of Toronto as an assistant professor. Agrawal is the Academic Director of the Centre for Innovation and Entrepreneurship at Rotman School of Management.

=== NEXT Canada ===
In 2010, Agrawal co-founded and became the Academic Director of The Next 36, now part of NEXT Canada.

=== Creative Destruction Lab ===
Agrawal is Founder of the Creative Destruction Lab at the University of Toronto. The Lab was founded in 2012 as a seed-stage program for science-based companies. The program has five locations in Canada including Vancouver (UBC Sauder School of Business), Calgary (Haskayne School of Business), Montreal (HEC Montréal), and Halifax, Nova Scotia (Rowe School of Business). It has three locations in the United States at the University of Washington, the Georgia Institute of Technology, and the University of Wisconsin, Madison.

In 2015, the Toronto Lab added a machine learning and artificial intelligence (AI) stream. In 2017, the CDL launched a program focused on quantum machine learning.

=== Machine Learning and the Market for Intelligence ===
Agrawal is the conference co-chair of 'Machine Learning and the Market for Intelligence' with Shivon Zilis. Its third edition was held in October 2017 at the University of Toronto.

=== Kindred ===
Agrawal is co-founder of Kindred. The MIT Technology Review listed Kindred as one of the 50 Smartest Companies of 2017.

== Publications ==
Agrawal has been published in the Harvard Business Review several times. as well as the Oxford University Press.

According to Google Scholar, Agrawal has been cited 16457 times. According to Social Science Research Network he has 42 scholarly papers.

Agrawal is co-author of the book Power and Prediction: The Disruptive Economics of Artificial Intelligence, with Joshua Gans and Avi Goldfarb. The book was released in November 2022 by the Harvard Business Review.

Agrawal is co-author of the book Prediction Machines: The Simple Economics of Artificial Intelligence with Joshua Gans and Avi Goldfarb. The book was released in April 2018 by the Harvard Business Review.

== Awards and honours ==
Agrawal received the President's Impact Award at the University of Toronto in 2023.

Agrawal was appointed to the Order of Canada in June 2022.

Agrawal has been awarded Professor of the Year seven times by MBA classes at the Rotman School of Management, the Martin-Lang Award for Excellence in Teaching, and the Distinguished Scholarly Contribution Award in 2017.

Agrawal was included in the 'Power 50' list of most influential Canadians to watch in business in The Globe and Mail's Report on Business Magazine.

His co-founded company, Kindred AI, was featured at number 29 on MIT Technology Review's 2017 list of smartest companies in the world. Kindred Systems was acquired by the UK grocer Ocado in 2020.
