= Anine Bing Corp =

American fashion brand

Anine Bing
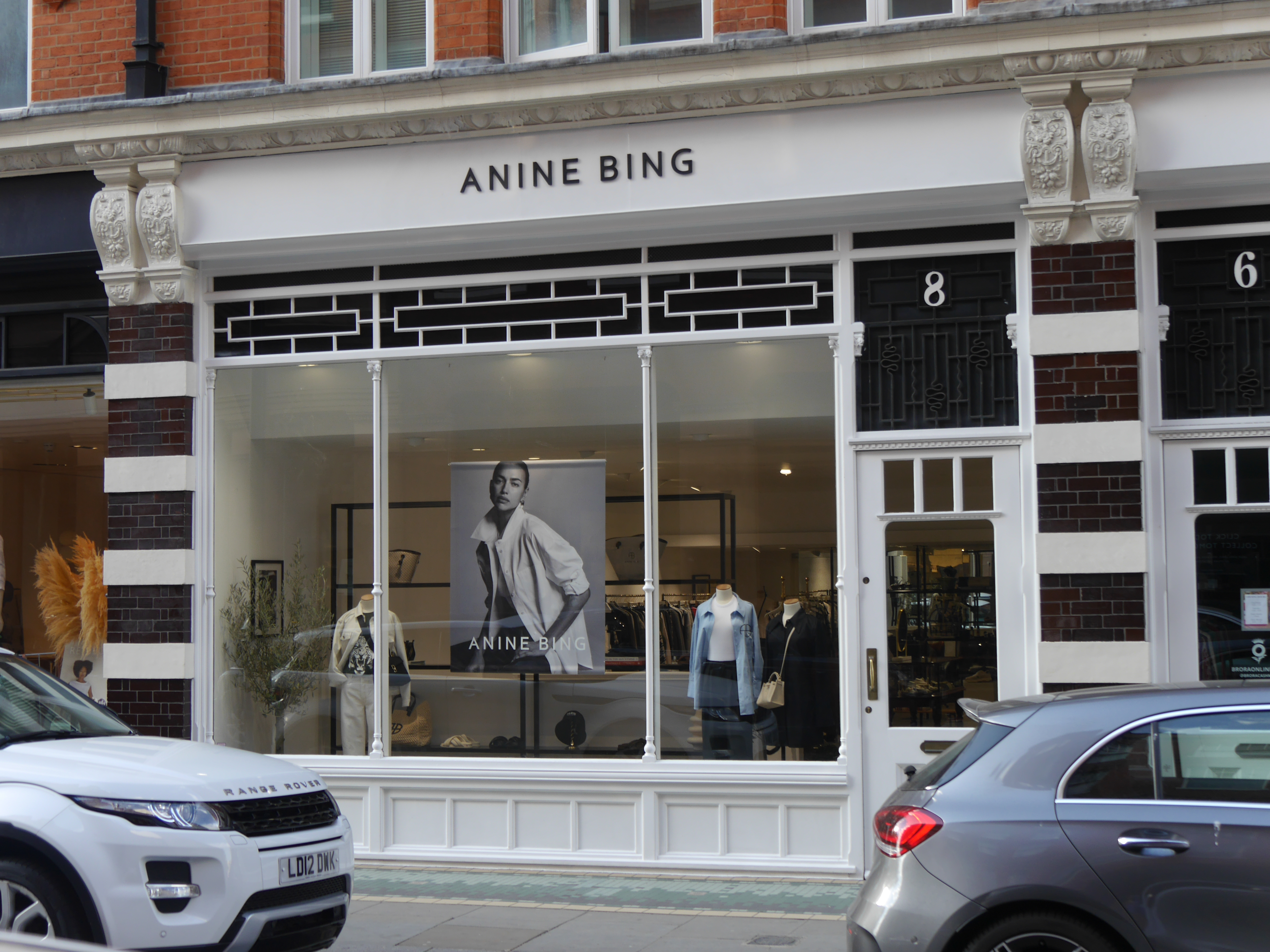
- Type: Private
- Industry: Wholesale trade (business-to-business) of clothing and footwear
- Headquarters: Los Angeles, California
- Key people: Anine Bing, Founder and Nikolai Nielsen
- Products: Clothing, Footwear, Accessories, Fragrance
- Number of employees: 251
- Website: www.aninebing.com

Anine Bing Corp is a women's fashion brand based out of Los Angeles, California. The founder, Anine Bing, is a blogger as well as a former model and singer. Anine Bing was launched in 2012 with its headquarters in downtown Los Angeles.

== History ==
ANINE BING was founded in 2012 after its creator model, singer, and fashion blogger Anine Bing decided to sell some of her old clothes online. The clothes sold out in one hour. Seeing this demand propelled Bing decided to start her own fashion line. Along with her husband Nicolai Nielsen, who had 20 years experience working in fashion production, the couple went to Turkey with 20 pairs of jeans and couple of vintage pieces as examples of what they wanted to produce. Since Bing had no formal design experience, she used the pieces to bring her visions to life. Bing posted her collection on Shopify. With Bing’s loyal blog readers and Instagram followers, the clothes started selling quickly. In the first month, they sold $50,000 worth of items and when they exceeded $100,000 by the second month, their bank suspected them of fraud and temporarily blocked their account. The brand’s first hire was Annika Meller who currently acts as Chief Strategy Officer. One year after their launch the company moved out Nielsen and Bing’s garage and into a downtown Los Angeles office, in which the company still resides.

By 2015, the brand opened its first flagship store in New York’s West Village and shortly thereafter a second location in Los Angeles.

2018 proved to be a pivotal year for the company as they expanded both their offices and their brick and mortar locations. Paul Courell joined as Chief Financial Officer and Jacob Rokeach as VP of eCommerce and Growth. With a $15 million investment from venture capital firms Index Ventures, Greycroft Partners and Felix Capital, the brand opened its first British location in West London.

Following this success, ANINE BING launched a unisex children’s line called BING KIDS. Working with the constraints of a post-COVID world, Bing decided to create an athleisure line called ANINE BING SPORT which launched in 2021. Marking their tenth anniversary, the brand ventured into cosmetics developing their first fragrance, Savage Rose.

In 2024, the company opened offices in Paris with the newly appointed Julie Bourgeois as first global president. There are 21 stores worldwide.

== Collaborations ==
In 2020, Anine Bing teamed up with supermodel Helena Christensen to create Anine Bing x Helena Christensen, a limited edition capsule collection.

In 2024, Anine Bing joined forces with Reebok for a 90s-inspired athleisure capsule collection called Anine Bing x Reebok. Additionally, Anine Bing collaborated with Ole Henriksen to develop the first-ever glitter formula shade of Pout Preserve Peptide Lip Treatment.

== Leadership ==
The Chief Executive Officer is Nico Bing (formerly Nicolai Nielsen). When Nico was 17, he started his brand in Denmark called Catwalk Scum, a vintage streetwear brand. Nico owned and operated the business for over a decade expanding throughout Demark before selling it in the late 2000s.

The Chief Creative Officer is model, singer, and blogger Anine Bing.

== Advertising and Marketing ==
The brand hired supermodel Kate Moss to be the face of their Fall 2024 Campaign. The campaign was shot by Chris Colls.

== Philanthropy ==
In 2020, the company launched a limited edition sweatshirt to benefit the nonprofit organization Every Mother Counts. In conjunction with Women's History Month, Breast Cancer Research Foundation teamed up with Anine Bing. In 2021, Anine Bing partnered with Dress for Success for Women's History Month. The company donated one hour of pay for all of their staff internationally.
