= Dave Bayer =

American mathematician

David Bayer
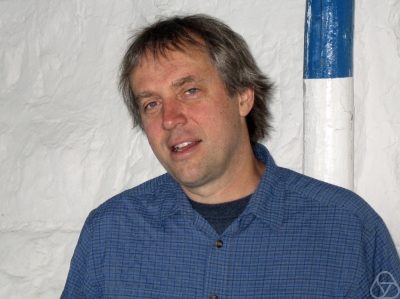
- Dave Bayer in 2006 (photo from MFO)
- Born: November 29, 1955 (age 70); Rochester, New York, U.S.
- Education: Swarthmore College (BA); Harvard University (PhD)
- Scientific career
- Fields: Mathematics, film
- Workplaces: Columbia University
- Thesis: The Division Algorithm and the Hilbert Scheme (1982)
- Doctoral advisor: Heisuke Hironaka

David Allen Bayer (born November 29, 1955) is an American mathematician known for his contributions in algebra and symbolic computation and for his consulting work in the movie industry. He is a professor of mathematics at Barnard College, Columbia University.

== Education and career ==
Bayer graduated from Swarthmore College with a Bachelor of Arts with highest honors in 1977. As a Swarthmore undergraduate, he attended a course on combinatorial algorithms given by Herbert Wilf. During that semester, Bayer related several original ideas to Wilf on the subject. These contributions were later incorporated into the second edition of Wilf and Albert Nijenhuis' influential book Combinatorial Algorithms, with a detailed acknowledgement by its authors. Bayer subsequently earned his Ph.D. at Harvard University in 1982 under the direction of Heisuke Hironaka with a dissertation entitled The Division Algorithm and the Hilbert Scheme. He joined Columbia University thereafter.

Bayer is the son of Joan and Bryce Bayer, the inventor of the Bayer filter.

== Contributions ==
Bayer has worked in various areas of algebra and symbolic computation, including Hilbert functions, Betti numbers, and linear programming. He has written a number of highly cited papers in these areas with other notable mathematicians, including Bernd Sturmfels, Jeffrey Lagarias, Persi Diaconis, Irena Peeva, and David Eisenbud. Bayer is one of ten individuals cited in the white paper published by the pseudonymous Satoshi Nakamoto describing the technological underpinnings of Bitcoin. He is cited as a co-author, along with Stuart Haber and W. Scott Stornetta, of a paper to improve on a system for tamper-proofing timestamps by incorporating Merkle trees.

== Consulting ==
Bayer was a mathematics consultant for the film A Beautiful Mind, the biopic of John Nash, and also had a cameo as one of the "Pen Ceremony" professors.
