= Greycroft =

American venture capital firm

Greycroft LP
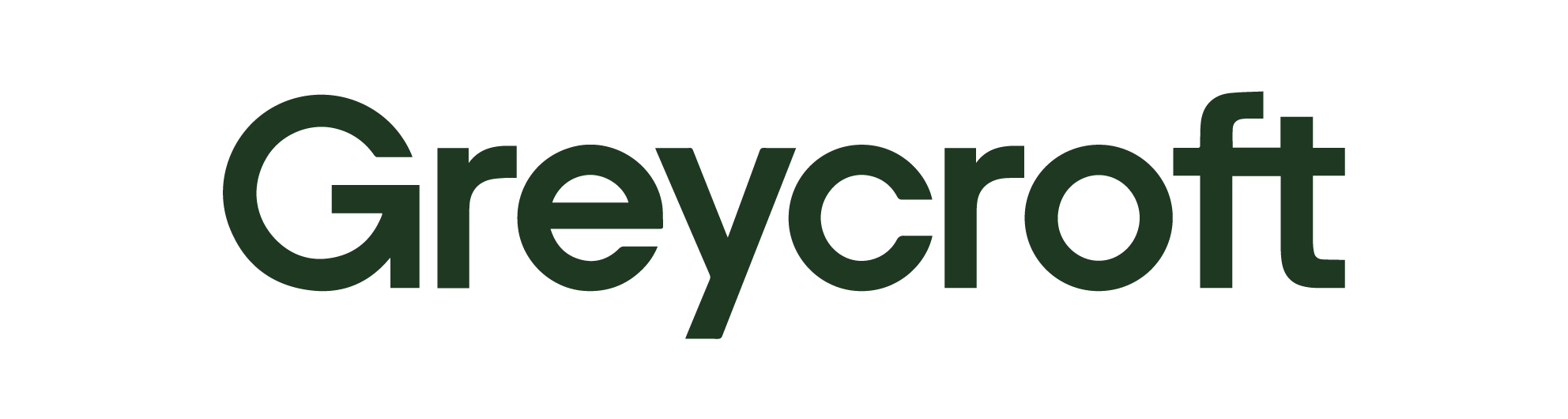
- Type: Private
- Industry: Venture capital
- Founded: 2006
- Headquarters: New York City; Los Angeles, California; San Francisco, California
- Number of employees: 60
- Website: www.greycroft.com

Greycroft LP is an American venture capital firm with over $3 billion in assets under management.

Notable investments by the firm have included Bird Global, Bumble, HuffPost, Goop, Scopely, The RealReal, and Venmo. Greycroft was founded in 2006 by Alan Patricof, Dana Settle, and Ian Sigalow. The firm is headquartered in New York City, Los Angeles, and the San Francisco Bay Area.

== History ==
Greycroft was co-founded in 2006 by venture capitalist Alan Patricof, who previously founded Apax Partners, a European private equity group with $50 billion under management.

Greycroft raised its first fund (Greycroft I) with $75 million of investor commitments in 2006, Greycroft II with $131 million in 2010, Greycroft III with $175 million fund in 2015, Greycroft IV with $200 million in 2018, Greycroft V with $250 million in 2018, and Greycroft VI with $310 million in 2020. In 2014, Greycroft raised its first growth fund, Greycroft Growth, with $200 million.

Greycroft raised Greycroft Growth II fund with $250 million in 2017. Greycroft raised Greycroft Growth III, a $368 million growth fund in 2020. The firm raised over $1B in new funds in 2023 for Greycroft Partners VII and Greycroft Growth IV.

Its recent investments include Stability AI, Contextual AI, and Reken.

== Investments ==
Greycroft has invested in over 300 companies located in 45 cities internationally, with the majority of these companies headquartered in the United States.

The firm's notable investments include:

- Braintree, acquired by PayPal for $800 million in 2013
- Buddy Media, acquired by Salesforce.com for $800 million in 2012
- Candid, raised a $63.4 million Series B round in 2019
- Convoz, a startup founded by Chamillionaire.
- Maker Studios, acquired by Disney for $950 million in 2014
- Plated.com, acquired by Albertsons for $200 million in 2017
- Munchery, ceased operations in 2019
- Osmosis, raised a $4 million Series A round in 2019
- Selerio, acquired by Streem in 2019
- Trunk Club, acquired by Nordstrom for $350 million in 2014
- Venmo, acquired by PayPal for $800 million in 2016
- Boxed, raised $6.5M in 2014
- Scopely, raised $200M Series D round in 2019
- Yeahka, IPO executed on Hong Kong Stock Exchange in 2020
- BrightHealth, raised $200M Series C in 2018
- Anine Bing, raised $15M Series A in 2018
- App Annie, raised $63M Series E in 2016
- Thrive Market, raised $111M Series B in 2016
- The RealReal, whose IPO was executed in June 2019 and listed to Nasdaq
- Flutterwave, raised $35M Series B in 2019
- Acorns, raised $105M Series E round in 2019
- Icertis, became a "unicorn" and raised a $115M Series E in 2019
- Public.com, raised $15M Series B in 2020
- LEX Markets, raised $4M Seed in 2019
- Axios, raised $20M Series B in 2017
- Huffington Post, sold to AOL for $315M in 2011
- Mapped, raised $6.5M Seed II in 2021
- Free Range Games, raised undisclosed amount Series A in 2015
- AmplifAI raised $18.5 million Series A in 2021
- Leena AI, raised $30 million in a Series B funding round in 2021
- Goop, raised a $50 million Series C in 2018
