= Reza Satchu =

Canadian businessman

- Born: 1969 (age 56–57); Mombasa, Kenya
- Education: McGill University (BA); Harvard Business School (MBA)
- Occupations: Businessman; Educator
- Spouse: Marion Annau

Reza Satchu is a Canadian businessman and educator who is the co-founder of The Next 36 and Alignvest Management Corporation. He is also a faculty member at the Harvard Business School.

== Early life and education ==
Born in Mombasa, Kenya, Satchu was seven when his family emigrated to Toronto in 1976 under Prime Minister Pierre Trudeau's policy to accept Ismaili immigrants from East Africa. His family settled in Scarborough, where his father worked as a real estate agent and his mother as a secretary.

After high school, Satchu attended McGill University. Initially planning to become a doctor, he switched majors and earned a bachelor's degree in economics in 1991. He then moved to New York City and worked as a financial analyst at Merrill Lynch but found the role limiting. He later attended Harvard Business School, graduating in 1996 with an MBA.

== Business career ==
After earning his MBA, Satchu joined Fenway Partners, a private equity firm, as managing director.

In 2000, SupplierMarket.com, a B2B supply chain software company, was sold to SAP Ariba for $925 million. Satchu was involved in the company alongside CEO and co-founder Jonathan Burgstone and his brother, Asif Satchu. He and his wife, Marion Annau, then moved back to Toronto.

In 2003, Satchu co-founded StorageNow, a consumer storage facility chain, which became the second largest storage company in Canada before it was sold in 2007 for $110 million.

In 2010, Satchu co-founded KGS-Alpha Capital Markets, a fixed income broker-dealer specializing in U.S. mortgage-backed and asset-backed securities. It was later acquired by the Bank of Montreal for over $400 million.

In 2014, Satchu founded Alignvest Management Corporation, a private investment firm. In 2018, Alignvest launched Alignvest Student Housing Real Estate Investment Trust. In October 2024, Satchu and partner Sanjil Shah sold Alignvest Student Housing REIT's properties to Forum for $1.686 billion.

== Academic career ==
Beginning in 2004, Satchu taught an undergraduate course at the University of Toronto titled The Economics of Entrepreneurship. As an adjunct professor, he did not take a salary and awarded $5,000 scholarships to top students using his own funds. In 2011, McGill University named him a recipient of its Management Achievement Award.

In 2020, Satchu joined Harvard Business School, where he teaches The Founder Mindset and Founder Launch. Founder Launch requires students to start a business and forgo recruiting for other positions during the course. Guest speakers in his courses have included Kevin O'Leary, Tim Ferriss, Alix Earle, and Reese Witherspoon

Inspired by his University of Toronto course, Satchu co-founded The Next 36 in 2011. The Next 36 offers students an eight-month entrepreneurship program at the University of Toronto.

== Awards and recognition ==
Satchu has received a number of awards for his contributions. In 2011, McGill University named him a recipient of its Management Achievement Award. In 2025, Satchu received the King Charles III Coronation Medal. That same year, received McGill University's Distinguished Leader Award.
