= Christian Catalini =

Italian- Canadian Researcher and Entrepreneur

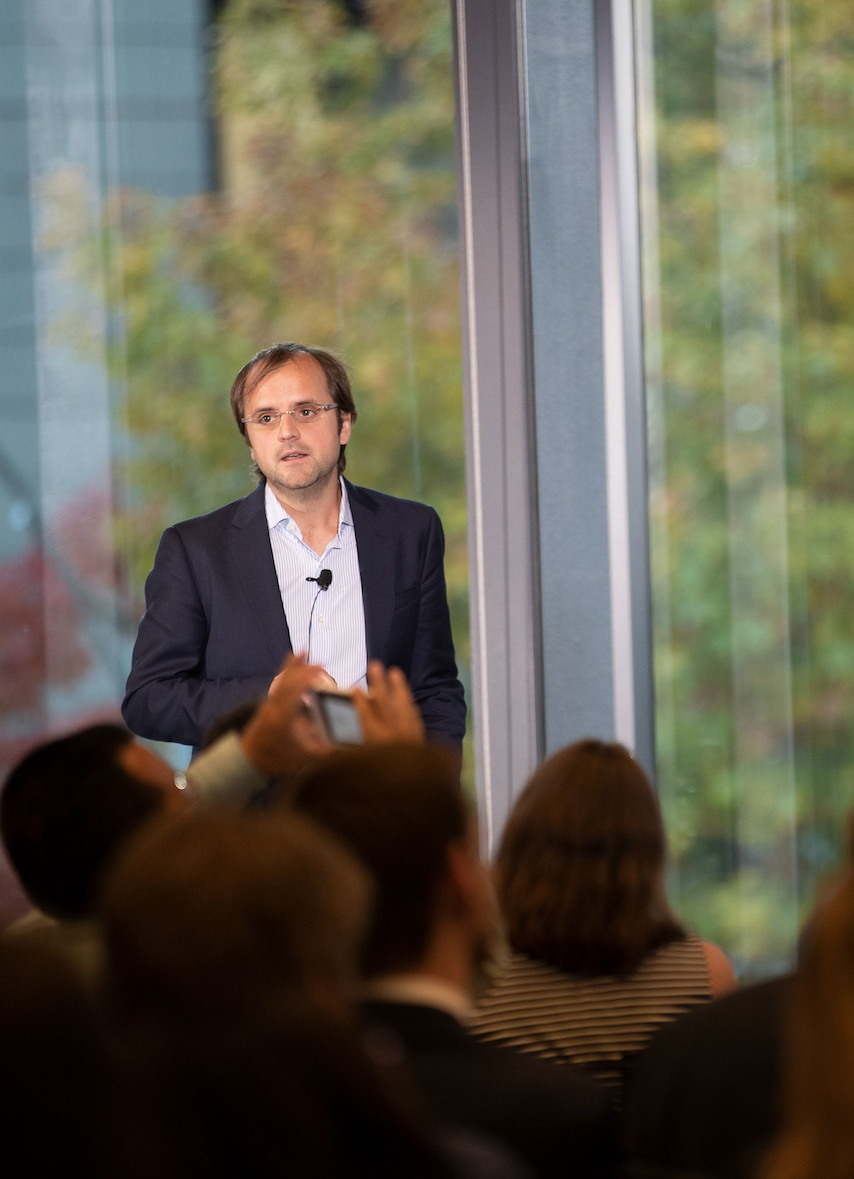
- Christian Catalini
- Born: Ancona, Italy
- Education: Bocconi University (MSc, BSc); University of Toronto (PhD)
- Scientific career
- Fields: Economics
- Workplaces: MIT Sloan School of Management
- Doctoral advisor: Ajay Agrawal
- Website: www.catalini.com

Christian Catalini is an Italian-Canadian researcher and entrepreneur. He is a co-creator of Diem (formerly Libra), was the Chief Economist of the Diem Association, and is a research scientist at the MIT Sloan School of Management. With David Marcus, he cofounded the startup company Lightspark.

Catalini is known for his research on the economics of cryptocurrencies and blockchain technology, and for the economical design of Diem. His past research focused on the economics of crowdfunding, early stage capital formation, the economics of science and technology.

== Career ==
Catalini was on the faculty of MIT from 2013 until 2021, and was appointed in 2018 as Faculty Research Fellow at the National Bureau of Economic Research in the Productivity, Innovation and Entrepreneurship Program.

In 2013, Catalini co-designed with Catherine Tucker the MIT Digital Currency Experiment that distributed $500,000 in Bitcoin to all MIT undergraduates. Catalini and Tucker published the results of their research study in Science.

In 2017, Catalini founded the MIT Cryptoeconomics Lab, which brings together the fields of economics and computer science to study cryptocurrency protocols, their incentives and market design.

In 2018, Catalini joined David Marcus' team at Facebook, Inc. to develop the economical design of Libra (now Diem). Since 2020, he is seconded to the Diem Association as its Chief Economist. At Diem, Catalini is focused on the economic, market design, growth incentives, and business model of the project.

In 2022, Catalini joined Coinbase Institute and sits on the Advisory Board.

== Education ==
Christian Catalini was born in Ancona, Italy. He studied economics and business at Bocconi University in Milan (B.Sc. and M.Sc.). In 2013, Catalini earned a Ph.D. degree from the University of Toronto (Rotman School of Management) for research supervised by Ajay Agrawal. During his Ph.D., Catalini worked with Ajay Agrawal to establish the Creative Destruction Lab (CDL) at the University of Toronto, served as its Associate Director (2012-2013), and then as a member of the CDL Strategic Advisory Board (2013-2018). Since 2019, he is an Associate in the Creative Destruction Lab Blockchain Stream.

== Research ==
Catalini is best known for some of his fundamental early work on the economics of cryptocurrencies and blockchain technology, crowdfunding, early stage capital formation, and the economics of science. His research on these topics has been featured in Nature, Science, the New York Times, CNN, the Wall Street Journal, the Economist, CNBC, WIRED, NPR, Forbes, Bloomberg, TechCrunch, the Financial Times, the Chicago Tribune, the Boston Globe, VICE news, the Washington Post, and Reuters among others.

In 2017, Catalini received the Ewing Marion Kauffman Foundation Junior Faculty Fellowship in Entrepreneurship Research. In 2014, Catalini's thesis was awarded the Wiley Blackwell Outstanding Dissertation Award in Business Policy and Strategy for “Three Essays on the Impact of Geographic and Social Proximity on Innovation”, assigned by the Business Policy and Strategy division of the Academy of Management.

Catalini has presented his work at a variety of institutions including Harvard University, MIT, Yale University, London Business School, New York University, UC Berkeley, Stanford University, the Council on Foreign Relations, the Federal Reserve Bank, the Federal Trade Commission, the US Treasury, the U.S. Securities and Exchange Commission, the Commodity Futures Trading Commission, the World Bank, the International Monetary Fund, the World Economic Forum, the White House OSTP, and a number of central banks and US and global regulators.
