= Li's criterion =

Statement in number theory

In number theory, Li's criterion is a particular statement about the positivity of a certain sequence that is equivalent to the Riemann hypothesis. The criterion is named after Xian-Jin Li, who presented it in 1997. In 1999, Enrico Bombieri and Jeffrey C. Lagarias provided a generalization, showing that Li's positivity condition applies to any collection of points that lie on the Re(s) = 1/2 axis.

== Definition ==
The Riemann ξ function is given by

$$\xi (s)=\frac{1}{2}s(s-1) \pi^{-s/2} \Gamma \left(\frac{s}{2}\right) \zeta(s)$$

where ζ is the Riemann zeta function. Consider the sequence

$$\lambda_n = \frac{1}{(n-1)!} \left. \frac{d^n}{ds^n}
\left[s^{n-1} \log \xi(s) \right] \right|_{s=1}.$$

Li's criterion is then the statement that

the Riemann hypothesis is equivalent to the statement that $\lambda_n > 0$ for every positive integer $n$.

The numbers $\lambda_n$ (sometimes defined with a slightly different normalization) are called Keiper-Li coefficients or Li coefficients. They may also be expressed in terms of the non-trivial zeros of the Riemann zeta function:

$$\lambda_n=\sum_{\rho} \left[1-
\left(1-\frac{1}{\rho}\right)^n\right]$$

where the sum extends over ρ, the non-trivial zeros of the zeta function. This conditionally convergent sum should be understood in the sense that is usually used in number theory, namely, that

$$\sum_\rho = \lim_{N\to\infty} \sum_{|\operatorname{Im}(\rho)|\le N}.$$

(Re(s) and Im(s) denote the real and imaginary parts of s, respectively.)

The positivity of $\lambda_n$ has been verified up to $n = 10^5$ by direct computation.

== Proof ==
Note that $\left|1-\frac{1}{\rho}\right| < 1 \Leftrightarrow |\rho-1| < |\rho| \Leftrightarrow Re(\rho) > 1/2$.

Then, starting with an entire function $f(s) = \prod_\rho{\left(1-\frac{s}{\rho}\right)}$, let $\phi(z) = f\left(\frac{1}{1-z}\right)$.

$\phi$ vanishes when $\frac{1}{1-z} = \rho \Leftrightarrow z = 1-\frac{1}{\rho}$. Hence, $\frac{\phi'(z)}{\phi(z)}$ is holomorphic on the unit disk $|z| < 1$ iff $\left|1-\frac{1}{\rho}\right| \ge 1 \Leftrightarrow Re(\rho) \le 1/2$.

Write the Taylor series $\frac{\phi'(z)}{\phi(z)} = \sum_{n=0}^\infty c_n z^n$. Since

$$\log \phi(z) = \sum_\rho{ \log \left(1-\frac{1}{\rho (1-z)}\right)} = \sum_\rho{ \log\left(1-\frac{1}{\rho}-z\right)-\log(1-z)}$$

we have

$$\frac{\phi'(z)}{\phi(z)} = \sum_\rho{ \frac{1}{1-z}-\frac{1}{1-\frac{1}{\rho}-z}}$$

so that

$$c_n = \sum_\rho{ 1-\left(1-\frac{1}{\rho}\right)^{-n-1}} = \sum_\rho {1-\left(1-\frac{1}{1-\rho}\right)^{n+1}}$$.

Finally, if each zero $\rho$ comes paired with its complex conjugate $\bar{\rho}$, then we may combine terms to get

$c_n = \sum_{\rho}{Re\left(1-\left(1-\frac{1}{1-\rho}\right)^{n+1}\right)}$.	1

The condition $Re(\rho) \le 1/2$ then becomes equivalent to $\lim \sup_{n \to \infty} |c_n|^{1/n} \le 1$. The right-hand side of (1) is obviously nonnegative when both $n \ge 0$ and $\left|1-\frac{1}{1-\rho}\right| \le 1 \Leftrightarrow\left|1-\frac{1}{\rho}\right| \ge 1 \Leftrightarrow Re(\rho) \le 1/2$ . Conversely, ordering the $\rho$ by $\left|1-\frac{1}{1-\rho}\right|$, we see that the largest $\left|1-\frac{1}{1-\rho}\right|> 1$ term ($\Leftrightarrow Re(\rho) > 1/2$) dominates the sum as $n \to \infty$, and hence $c_n$ becomes negative sometimes. P. Freitas (2008). "a Li–type criterion for zero–free half-planes of Riemann's zeta function". arXiv:math.MG/0507368.

== Generalizations ==
Bombieri and Lagarias demonstrate that a similar criterion holds for any collection of complex numbers, and is thus not restricted to the Riemann hypothesis. More precisely, let R = {ρ} be any collection of complex numbers ρ, not containing ρ = 1, which satisfies

$$\sum_\rho \frac{1+\left|\operatorname{Re}(\rho)\right|}{(1+|\rho|)^2} < \infty.$$

Then one may make several equivalent statements about such a set. One such statement is the following:

One has $\operatorname{Re}(\rho) \le 1/2$ for every ρ if and only if

$$\sum_\rho\operatorname{Re}\left[1-\left(1-\frac{1}{\rho}\right)^{-n}\right]
\ge 0$$

for all positive integers n.

One may make a more interesting statement, if the set R obeys a certain functional equation under the replacement s ↦ 1 − s. Namely, if, whenever ρ is in R, then both the complex conjugate $\overline{\rho}$ and $1-\rho$ are in R, then Li's criterion can be stated as:

One has Re(ρ) = 1/2 for every ρ if and only if

$$\sum_\rho\left[1-\left(1-\frac{1}{\rho}\right)^n \right] \ge 0$$

for all positive integers n.

Bombieri and Lagarias also show that Li's criterion follows from Weil's criterion for the Riemann hypothesis.

In 2006, P. Freitas proved that all of the zeros of the Riemann zeta function lie inside the region $\Re(s) \leq \tau/2$, where $\tau \in [1/2, \infty)$ if and only if the numbers

$$\sum_\rho\left[1-\left(\frac{\rho}{\rho-\tau}\right)^n \right]$$

are non-negative for all positive integers $n$. These coefficients are called the $\tau$-Li coefficients. A. Droll generalized the results to the extended Selberg class, A. Bucur, A.-M. Ernvall-Hytönen, A. Odžak and L. Smajlović investigated the behavior of the coefficients for certain functions violating the Riemann hypothesis, and N. Palojärvi proved explicit conditions between finitely many $\tau$-Li coefficients and zero-free regions.
