= 3x + 1 semigroup =

Special semigroup of positive rational numbers

In algebra, the 3x + 1 semigroup is a special subsemigroup of the multiplicative semigroup of all positive rational numbers. The elements of a generating set of this semigroup are related to the sequence of numbers involved in the still open Collatz conjecture or the "3x + 1 problem". The 3x + 1 semigroup has been used to prove a weaker form of the Collatz conjecture. In fact, it was in such context the concept of the 3x + 1 semigroup was introduced by H. Farkas in 2005. Various generalizations of the 3x + 1 semigroup have been constructed and their properties have been investigated.

== Definition ==
The 3x + 1 semigroup is the multiplicative semigroup of positive rational numbers generated by the set
$$\{2\}\cup \left\{\frac{2k+1}{3k+2} : k\geq 0\right\}=\left\{ 2, \frac{1}{2}, \frac{3}{5}, \frac{5}{8}, \frac{7}{11},\ldots \right\}.$$

The function $T : \mathbb{Z} \to \mathbb{Z}$ as defined below is used in the "shortcut" definition of the Collatz conjecture:

$$T(n)=\begin{cases} \frac{n}{2} & \text{if } n \text{ is even}\\[4px] \frac{3n+1}{2} & \text{if } n \text{ is odd}\end{cases}$$

The Collatz conjecture asserts that for each positive integer $n$, there is some iterate of $T$ with itself which maps $n$ to 1, that is, there is some integer $k$ such that $T^{(k)}(n)=1$. For example if $n=7$ then the values of $T^{(k)}(n)$ for $k = 1, 2, 3,...$ are 11, 17, 26, 13, 20, 10, 5, 8, 4, 2, 1 and $T^{(11)}(7)=1$.

The relation between the 3x + 1 semigroup and the Collatz conjecture is that the 3x + 1 semigroup is also generated by the set
$$\left\{ \dfrac{n}{T(n)} : n>0 \right\}.$$

== The weak Collatz conjecture ==
The weak Collatz conjecture asserts the following: "The 3x + 1 semigroup contains every positive integer." This was formulated by Farkas and it has been proven to be true as a consequence of the following property of the 3x + 1 semigroup:

The 3x + 1 semigroup S equals the set of all positive rationals a/b in lowest terms having the property that b ≢ 0 (mod 3). In particular, S contains every positive integer.

== The wild semigroup ==
The semigroup generated by the set
$$\left\{\frac{1}{2}\right\}\cup \left\{\frac{3k+2}{2k+1}:k\geq 0\right\},$$
which is also generated by the set
$$\left\{\frac{T(n)}{n}: n>0\right\},$$
is called the wild semigroup. The integers in the wild semigroup consist of all integers m such that m ≢ 0 (mod 3).
