= Jeffrey Lagarias =

American mathematician

Jeffrey Clark Lagarias
- Born: November 16, 1949 (age 76); Pittsburgh, Pennsylvania
- Education: MIT (Ph.D., S.M., S.B.)
- Awards: Lester R. Ford Award (1986)
- Scientific career
- Fields: Mathematics
- Workplaces: University of Michigan (2004–)
- Thesis: The 4-part of the Class Group of a Quadratic Field (1974)
- Doctoral advisor: Harold Stark

Jeffrey Clark Lagarias (born November 16, 1949) is a mathematician and professor at the University of Michigan.

== Education ==
While in high school in 1966, Lagarias studied astronomy at the Summer Science Program.

He completed an S.B. and S.M. in Mathematics at the Massachusetts Institute of Technology in 1972. The title of his thesis was "Evaluation of certain character sums". He was a Putnam Fellow at MIT in 1970. He received his Ph.D. in Mathematics from MIT for his thesis "The 4-part of the class group of a quadratic field", in 1974. His advisor for both his masters and Ph.D. was Harold Stark.

== Career ==
In 1974, he joined AT&T Bell Laboratories and eventually became a member of technical staff. From 1995 to 2004, he was a Technology Consultant at AT&T Research Laboratories. In 2004, he moved to the University of Michigan as a professor of mathematics.

== Research ==
Lagarias originally worked in analytic algebraic number theory. His later work has been in theoretical computer science.

Lagarias discovered an elementary problem that is equivalent to the Riemann hypothesis, namely whether for all n > 0, we have

$$\sigma(n) \le H_n + e^{H_n} \ln H_n$$

with equality only when n = 1. Here H_{n} is the nth harmonic number, the sum of the reciprocals of the first $n$ positive integers, and σ(n) is the divisor function, the sum of the positive divisors of n.

He disproved Keller's conjecture in dimensions at least 10. Lagarias has also done work on the Collatz conjecture and Li's criterion and has written several highly cited papers in symbolic computation with Dave Bayer.

== Awards and honors ==
Lagarias received in 1986 a Lester R. Ford award from the Mathematical Association of America and again in 2007.

In 2012, he became a fellow of the American Mathematical Society.

In 2024 he was elected as a member of the National Academy of Sciences.
