= Riemann xi function =

Simpler variant of the Riemann zeta function

Riemann xi function $\xi(s)$ in the complex plane. The color of a point $s$ encodes the value of the function. Darker colors denote values closer to zero and hue encodes the value's argument.

In mathematics, the Riemann xi function is a variant of the Riemann zeta function, and is defined so as to have a particularly simple functional equation. The function is named in honour of Bernhard Riemann.

== Definition ==
Riemann's original lower-case "xi"-function, $\xi$ was renamed with a $\Xi$ (Greek uppercase letter "xi") by Edmund Landau. Landau's $\xi$ (lower-case "xi") is defined as

$$\xi(s) = \frac{1}{2} s(s-1) \pi^{-s/2} \Gamma\left(\frac{s}{2}\right) \zeta(s)$$

for $s \in \mathbb{C}$. Here $\zeta(s)$ denotes the Riemann zeta function and $\Gamma(s)$ is the gamma function.

The functional equation (or reflection formula) for Landau's $\xi$ is

$$\xi(1-s) = \xi(s) .$$

Riemann's original function, renamed as the upper-case $\Xi$ by Landau, satisfies

$$\Xi(s) = \xi \left(\tfrac{1}{2} + s i \right) ,$$

and obeys the functional equation

$$\Xi(-s) = \Xi(s) .$$

Both functions are entire and purely real for real arguments.

== Values ==
The general form for positive even integers is

$$\xi(2n) = (-1)^{n+1}\frac{n!}{(2n)!}B_{2n}2^{2n-1}\pi^{n}(2n-1)$$

where $B_n$ denotes the $n$th Bernoulli number. For example:

$$\xi(2) = {\frac{\pi}{6}}$$

== Series representations ==
The $\xi$ function has the series expansion

$$\frac{d}{dz} \ln \xi \left(\frac{-z}{1-z}\right) = \sum_{n=0}^\infty \lambda_{n+1} z^n,$$

where

$$\lambda_n = \frac{1}{(n-1)!} \left. \frac{d^n}{ds^n}
\left[s^{n-1} \log \xi(s) \right] \right|_{s=1} = \sum_{\rho} \left[ 1- \left(1-\frac{1}{\rho}\right)^n \right],$$

where the sum extends over $\rho$, the non-trivial zeros of the zeta function, in order of $\vert\Im(\rho)\vert$.

This expansion plays a particularly important role in Li's criterion, which states that the Riemann hypothesis is equivalent to having $\lambda_n > 0$ for all positive $n$.

== Hadamard product ==
A simple infinite product expansion is

$$\xi(s) = \frac12 \prod_\rho \left(1 - \frac{s}{\rho} \right),$$

where $\rho$ ranges over the roots of $\xi$.

To ensure convergence in the expansion, the product should be taken over "matching pairs" of zeroes, i.e., the factors for a pair of zeroes of the form $\rho$ and $\bar\rho$ should be grouped together.
