= Residue-class-wise affine group =

Group theory

In mathematics, specifically in group theory, residue-class-wise affine groups are certain permutation groups acting on $\mathbb{Z}$ (the integers), whose elements are bijective residue-class-wise affine mappings.

A mapping $f: \mathbb{Z} \rightarrow \mathbb{Z}$ is called residue-class-wise affine if there is a nonzero integer $m$ such that the restrictions of $f$ to the residue classes (mod $m$) are all affine. This means that for any residue class $r(m) \in \mathbb{Z}/m\mathbb{Z}$ there are coefficients $a_{r(m)}, b_{r(m)}, c_{r(m)} \in \mathbb{Z}$ such that the restriction of the mapping $f$ to the set $r(m) = \{r + km \mid k \in \mathbb{Z}\}$ is given by

$$f|_{r(m)}: r(m) \rightarrow \mathbb{Z}, \ n \mapsto
\frac{a_{r(m)} \cdot n + b_{r(m)}}{c_{r(m)}}.$$

Residue-class-wise affine groups are countable, and they are accessible to computational investigations. Many of them act multiply transitively on $\mathbb{Z}$ or on subsets thereof.

A particularly basic type of residue-class-wise affine permutations are the class transpositions: given disjoint residue classes $r_1(m_1)$ and $r_2(m_2)$, the corresponding class transposition is the permutation of $\mathbb{Z}$ which interchanges $r_1+km_1$ and $r_2+km_2$ for every $k \in \mathbb{Z}$ and which fixes everything else. Here it is assumed that $0 \leq r_1 < m_1$ and that $0 \leq r_2 < m_2$.

The set of all class transpositions of $\mathbb{Z}$ generates a countable simple group which has the following properties:

- It is not finitely generated.
- Every finite group, every free product of finite groups and every free group of finite rank embeds into it.
- The class of its subgroups is closed under taking direct products, under taking wreath products with finite groups, and under taking restricted wreath products with the infinite cyclic group.
- It has finitely generated subgroups which do not have finite presentations.
- It has finitely generated subgroups with algorithmically unsolvable membership problem.
- It has an uncountable series of simple subgroups which is parametrized by the sets of odd primes.

It is straightforward to generalize the notion of a residue-class-wise affine group to groups acting on suitable rings other than $\mathbb{Z}$, though only little work in this direction has been done so far.

See also the Collatz conjecture, which is an assertion about a surjective, but not injective residue-class-wise affine mapping.

== References and external links ==
- Stefan Kohl. Restklassenweise affine Gruppen. Dissertation, Universität Stuttgart, 2005. Archivserver der Deutschen Nationalbibliothek OPUS-Datenbank(Universität Stuttgart)
- Stefan Kohl. RCWA – Residue-Class-Wise Affine Groups. GAP package. 2005.
- Stefan Kohl. A Simple Group Generated by Involutions Interchanging Residue Classes of the Integers. Math. Z. 264 (2010), no. 4, 927–938.
