= The Next 36 =

The Next 36 is an entrepreneurship initiative that identifies and trains promising Canadian entrepreneurs. The program selects 36 university students per year to work in an intense program and receive advice from Canadian business experts. It was co-founded by Reza Satchu in 2010.
