= Anine Bing =

Danish model, influencer and fashion designer

- Born: 30 November 1982 (age 43); Kongens Lyngby, Denmark
- Years active: 2000–2012
- Spouse: Nikolai Nielsen (m. 2012)
- Modelling information
- Height: 5 ft 8.5 in (1.74 m)
- Hair colour: Dark blonde
- Eye colour: Brown

Anine Bing (born 30 November 1982) is a Danish model, influencer, and fashion designer. She began her career as a fashion model in the early 2000s and gained attention, in part due to her relationship with Swedish footballer Anders Svensson.

Bing later moved to Los Angeles, where she transitioned into music and became the lead singer of the band Kill Your Darlings. In 2012, she retired from modeling and launched her fashion line, Anine Bing Corp.

== Early years ==
Bing was born in Denmark to a Danish father and half-Brazilian mother. She is one of four children. At age 7, Bing started to take violin lessons, but eventually turned to singing. She performed with the Royal Danish Academy of Music choir. At age 10, her family emigrated from Denmark to Sweden because of her father's career. At age 14, she began working at a restaurant to earn money before becoming a model. Bing attended the Waldorf School where she played the flute, violin, and guitar.

== Career ==
=== Modeling career ===
Bing started modeling at the age 15. She was sent to Milan to go on castings. Bing has appeared on the cover of the Swedish men's magazine Café four times. Additionally, she has done campaigns for Ellos, Stadium, and Ragno. In 2002, the UK city of Birmingham deemed an ad featuring Bing, by the Italian sportswear company Ellesse, to be too racy for prominent display next to the Town Hall.

In 2008, Bing left New York City after being told she was too shapely and too short to model. She subsequently moved to Los Angeles where she lived off and on until permanently moving to in 2012.

Bing was co-host of a celebrity interview show called Klick! on Sweden's TV7.

=== Music career ===
Bing was the lead singer of Kill Your Darlings.

In August 2009, the single "Maybe Tomorrow" was released on iTunes and YouTube. The music video was in conjunction with Los Angeles premium jeans label ALINA JEANS.

Bing announced that she would debut her first solo album called "Therapy". This was the first time in 14 years that Bing made music.

=== Fashion ===
In 2012, with her husband, Bing launched her eponymous brand Anine Bing Corp out of her garage in Los Angeles. The brand focused on designing clothes with a European aesthetic fused with vintage Americana.

== Lifestyle ==
In the 2000s, Bing began to blog. By 2014, the Aftonbladet, a Swedish newspaper, dubbed Bing a superblogger. Bing's now-defunct blog "Anine's World" featured her clothing picks which would sell out quickly. This led to the idea of starting her own clothing brand.

== Personal life ==
In 2001, she started dating Swedish football player Anders Svensson. The pair became engaged but broke up in 2003. In the May 2006 issue of Playboy Magazine, Bing reported to have dated actor Jim Carrey and hockey player Peter Forsberg.

Bing is married to her business partner Nicolai Nielsen with whom she has two children, Bianca and Benjamin. The couple currently reside in Montecito, California.
