= Peer-to-peer insurance =

Type of insurance contract

Peer-to-peer insurance is a reciprocity insurance contract through the Collaborative consumption concept.

== General ==
The aims of peer-to-peer insurance are to save money through reduced overhead costs, increase transparency, reduce inefficiencies, and especially to reduce the inherent conflict between insurance carriers and their policyholders at the time of a claim.

There are many types of peer-to-peer insurance. The first type was created by an Insurance broker (as opposed to insurance companies). In this broker model, insurance policyholders will form small groups online. A part of the insurance premiums paid flow into a group fund, the other part to a third party insurance company. Minor damages to the insured policyholder are firstly paid out of this group fund. For claims above the deductible limit the regular insurer is called upon. When there is no insurance claim, the policyholder gets his/her share refunded from the group pool or credited towards the next policy year. If the group pool happens to be empty, a special insurance comes into force.

More recently, models created by insurance companies have arisen. The insurance model is similar to the broker model except that as the peer-to-peer provider is the actual insurance company. If the pool is insufficient to pay for the claims of its members, the insurance carrier pays the excess from its retained premiums and reinsurance. Conversely, if the pool is "profitable" (i.e. has few claims), the "excess" is given back to the pool or to a cause the pool members care about. Peer-to-Peer insurers take a flat fee for running the operations of the insurance enterprise. The fee is not dependent upon how many (or how few) paid claims there are.

A group can be set up by the policyholders, forming a social network somewhat like Facebook. In the broker model, the only requirement is that all group members must have the same type of insurance. Examples are liability insurance, household contents insurance, legal expenses insurance and electronics insurance. In the carrier model, the only requirement is that the group members have something in common, such as being members of the same club or believing in the same charity.

In the broker model, the peer-to-peer insurance concept carries no costs other than the special insurance. The providers are financed through brokerage commissions of insurance companies.

In the carrier model, the peer-to-peer insurance concept carries no cost other the fixed fee to the carrier's management and the cost of reinsurance and other more minor expenses.

== Historical ==
One of the earliest peer-to-peer insurance brokerage models was developed by the German Alecto GmbH, Berlin. In 2010, this brokerage version peer-to-peer-insurance-model was first introduced in the German insurance market under the brand Friendsurance. Large insurance companies such as R + V as well as large investors such as technology investors Horizons Ventures and the European [Regional Development Fund] (ERDF) were also won over for this model. The background to the development was the high number of insurance damage claims in Germany. The peer-to-peer approach aims to strengthen the sense of responsibility towards the group while minimizing the number of fraudulent cases.

In 2011, Friendsurance was awarded the "Service Innovation Award Insurance" and nominated as "Startup of the Year 2011" in a startup competition hosted by online startup magazine "Gründerszene".

In Poland, in December 2011, Dmitrij Żatuchin announced the soon-to-happen launch of Grupoli, eventually concluded in March 2012. Grupoli was the first Polish social insurance platform, offering their service as a safe place to conclude a support agreement between peers in the network for bicycles, phones, tablets, and laptops without the required approval from the Financial Supervision Authority.

In 2012, Oscar Health Insurance launched in New York City.

In 2013, about 90 percent of those who took advantage of the peer-to-peer insurance model were repaid contributions.

In 2014, the British insurance company Guevara introduced the peer-to-peer insurance concept for car insurance in the UK., whilst Friendsurance, in cooperation with the insurance industry, expanded the peer-to-peer insurance concept to include existing insurance policies whilst keeping price and service for the existing policy unchanged.

Also in 2014, P2P Protect Co., Ltd. (Chinese name 人人互保）was registered in HongKong in October 2014 as the Holding Company for a Peer to Peer Insurance model targeting at bringing transparency, claim fairness and pricing at cost to the insurance industry.

In 2015, PeerCover launched in New Zealand, Riovic launched in South Africa, In the Czech Republic, PRVNÍ KLUBOVÁ pojišťovna (The First Club Insurance Carrier) started in September 2015 as the world's first peer-to-peer insurance carrier.

TongJuBao.com, a Peer to Peer Quasi Insurance model focussing initially at covering social risks, was launched in China through a fully owned operating company incorporated in Shanghai in May 2015. The platform was launched operationally in November 2015 with a product range referred to on the platform including Marriage Safety, Child Safety and Family Unity.

In 2016, Huddle Insurance launched in Australia, initially with a peer-to-peer model of insurance, with plans to expand into peer-to-peer lending in the future.

Besure, a Canadian company from Calgary, and Otherwise in France has also announced their launch for 2016. These companies advertise they can reduce costs and bring transparency to the industry.

Darwinsurance in Italy is listed as the first Italian company who launched peer to peer insurance model in 2016. The platform was launched operationally in March 2017 with travel insurance underwritten by AIG and ERV.

== Empowerment ==
Participants in peer-to-peer insurance are given more control over their coverages. Control ranges from allowing peers to form their own risk pools for deductible coverages to allowing peers to make decisions about the proceeds of the pool to allowing peers to adjudicate their pool's claims. These decisions are traditionally made by the insurance carrier.
