= Catherine Tucker =

American economist

Catherine Tucker (born May 16, 1977) is the Sloan Distinguished Professor of Management at MIT Sloan, where she is also chair of the PhD program. She is known for her research into the consequences of digital data for electronic privacy, algorithmic bias, digital health, social media and online advertising. She is also a research associate at the NBER, cofounder of the Cryptoeconomics lab at MIT with Christian Catalini and coeditor at Quantitative Marketing Economics.

== Biography ==
Catherine Tucker was born in Oxford, and attended Merton College at the University of Oxford, studying Philosophy, Politics and Economics. She emigrated to the United States in 1999, and obtained a PhD in economics from Stanford University, advised by Susan Athey, Tim Bresnahan and Liran Einav. She is married and has four children. She is the niece of pioneering special effects make-up artist Christopher Tucker.

== Research field ==
Tucker's research focuses on the connections of marketing, economics of technology, law. Much of her publications have studied social media and its interactions with consumers. Tucker's research has evolved with the development of social media; her earlier publications focused on privacy and advertising, and now also focus in the direction of algorithmic influence and consumer interactions with the blockchain. She has published 67 scholarly papers in these related fields. Common outlets for Tucker's publications include Marketing Science, Quantitative Marketing and Economics, and the Journal of Marketing Research. She has expertise in studying how can firms use digital data and machine learning to improve performance.

== Career ==
Tucker teaches at the MIT Sloan School of Management and is chair of the MIT Sloan PhD Program. Tucker is also a cofounder of the MIT Cryptoeconomics lab which analyzes blockchain applications.

Tucker has given talks to the European Union Future of Privacy Forum Roundtable and the OECD Roundtable on Economics of Privacy. She has testified to the US Congress on algorithmic bias and online privacy. In 2011, she received a CAREER Award from the National Science Foundation. In 2012, she was admitted as a Research Associate of the National Bureau of Economic Research, and became the first woman to be awarded tenure in the MIT Marketing Department. In 2015, she received the Erin Anderson Award, honoring an "emerging research star...who has exceeded the normal expectations for someone of her rank in mentoring doctoral students or junior faculty members." In 2018, she received the William O'Dell Award, for an "article ... that has made a significant contribution to marketing theory, practice or methods". Later that year Tucker went on to receive the 2018 INFORMS Society for Marketing Science Long Term Impact Award. She then continued on with Duncan Simester to win the 2020 Weitz-Weiner-O'Dell Award from the American Marketing Association. Additionally, she was appointed a visiting fellow at All Souls College at the University of Oxford; and cofounded the Cryptoeconomics Lab at MIT.

== Selected publications ==
- ‘Privacy Protection and Technology Diffusion: The Case of Electronic Medical Records’ with Amalia Miller, Management Science (Lead Article), Vol. 55 No. 7, July 2009, pp. 1077–1093.
- 'Privacy Regulation and Online Advertising' with Avi Goldfarb, Management Science, Vol. 57 No. 1, January 2011, pp. 57–71.
- ‘Search Engine Advertising: Channel Substitution when Pricing Ads to Context’, with Avi Goldfarb, Management Science, Vol. 57 No 3, March 2011, pp. 458–470.
- 'Can Healthcare Information Technology Save Babies?' with Amalia Miller, Journal of Political Economy, Vol. 119 No. 2, April 2011, pp. 289–324.
- 'Online Display Advertising: Targeting and Obtrusiveness' with Avi Goldfarb, Marketing Science (Lead Article and Discussion Paper), Vol. 30 No. 3, May–June 2011, pp. 389–404.
- ‘When Does Retargeting Work? Timing Information Specificity’ with Anja Lambrecht, Journal of Marketing Research (William O'Dell Long-Term Impact Award Winner 2018), Vol. 50 (5), October 2013, pp. 561–576
- 'Harbingers of Failure' with Eric Anderson, Song Lin, and Duncan Simester. Journal of Marketing Research, Vol. 52 No. 5, October 2015, pp. 580–592.
- ‘When Early Adopters Don’t Adopt’ with Christian Catalini. Science Vol. 357, Issue 6347, July 2017, pp. 135–136.
- `Algorithmic Bias? An Empirical Study into Apparent Gender-Based Discrimination in the Display of STEM Career Ads' with Anja Lambrecht. Forthcoming at Management Science.
