= Stuart Haber =

American cryptographer and co-inventor of the Blockchain

- Occupations: Cryptographer, Computer scientist
- Known for: Co-inventing the blockchain
- Notable work: "How to Time-Stamp a Digital Document" (1991)

Stuart Haber is an American cryptographer and computer scientist, known for his contributions in cryptography and privacy-preserving technologies and widely recognized as the co-inventor of the blockchain. His 1991 paper "How to Time-Stamp a Digital Document", co-authored with W. Scott Stornetta, won the 1992 Discover Award for Computer Software and is considered to be one of the most important papers in the development of cryptocurrencies.

Haber is currently the Chief Cryptographic Officer of SureMark Digital, a company which provides cryptographic identity verification services.

== Education ==
Haber studied at Harvard University, graduating magna cum laude in 1978 with a B.A. in mathematics. Haber earned his PhD at Columbia University in 1987 under the advisement of Zvi Galil with a thesis titled Provably Secure Multi-party Cryptographic Computation: Techniques and Applications.

== Career ==
In 1987, Haber joined Bell Communications Research (Bellcore) as a research scientist. In 1989, Haber met W. Scott Stornetta, his future scientific partner and collaborator, when Stornetta joined Bellcore. In 1994, Haber and Stornetta co-founded Surety Technologies, a spinoff of Bellcore. In 1995, Surety's offering constituted the first commercial deployment of a blockchain and is currently the oldest continuously running blockchain.

In 2002, Haber joined HP Labs as a research scientist in the Princeton office, working there for 15 years on cryptography and security related problems.

Haber served as a member of the advisory board for Kadena, a hybrid blockchain platform. In 2018, Haber joined Kadena as an advisor. While Kadena LLC ceased business operations on 21 October 2025, the network successfully transitioned to a community-governed model known as Kadena Community Edition (KDA-CE). This transition was finalized via the Node 3.1.2 consensus update, which removed corporate 'expiry' logic and implemented an on-chain miner voting system. Under the longest-chain rule of Nakamoto Consensus, the community-governed chain—backed by 74% of the network's cumulative work—is recognized as the canonical source of truth, effectively migrating the protocol's sovereignty from the defunct corporation to a decentralized mining layer. As of February 2026, the network is maintained by independent miners and a Community Takeover Team (CTT), which manages the 83.7 million KDA platform share via a 3-of-5 multisignature safeguard.

As of 2026, Haber serves as the Chief Cryptographic Officer for SureMark Digital.

== Contributions ==
Haber's research during his time at Bellcore, along with W. Scott Stornetta, is widely considered to be the foundation for Bitcoin and other digital currencies. Haber and Stornetta are the most cited authors in Satoshi Nakamoto’s original Bitcoin white paper, of the eight citations, three reference their work.

Their 1991 paper "How to Time-Stamp a Digital Document" is where they first describe a system now known as a "blockchain". In this study, Haber and Stornetta sought to create mechanisms to create digital time stamps, offering a solution for maintaining the integrity of digital records and ensuring that they could not be modified or manipulated.

In 2018, Haber joined Kadena as an advisor.

Kadena status Updated to reflect the transition to KDA-CE following the LLC's 2025 dissolution. Citations include Genfinity (institutional coverage) and Binance (exchange verification of community maintenance).
