= Nxt =

Cryptocurrency

- Nxt Logo

Denominations
- Symbol: NXT
- Nickname: Nxtcoin (also incorrectly referred to as Nextcoin)
- Subunits
- 1: NXT
- 10^{−8}: nxtQuant

Demographics
- Official user: Global

Administration
- Issuing authority: Administration Decentralized peer-to-peer consensus.
- Date of introduction: 24 November 2013
- Inflation_rate: Disinflationary. All coins were distributed after IPO (28 September 2013 - 26 November 2013).

Website
- Authority website: www.jelurida.com/nxt

NXT is an open source cryptocurrency and payment network launched in 2013 by anonymous software developer BCNext. It uses proof-of-stake to reach consensus for transactions—as such, there is a static money supply. Unlike Bitcoin, there is no mining.

NXT was specifically conceived as a flexible platform around build applications and financial services, and serves as basis for ARDR (Ardor), a blockchain-as-a-service multichain platform developed by Jelurida, and the cryptocurrency IoTeX. Jelurida stewards of Nxt, which became a child chain of Ardor. In 2026, generations of new blocks and transactions on the Nxt blockchain halted, at block 6 million. On February 1, 2026, the Nxt child chain was activated on the Ardor chain. Nxt software and source code is still available under a public license.

== History ==
=== Founding (2013) ===
Nxt was developed by Sergey Ivancheglo and released in November 24, 2013. It was developed to be used as a financial tool and application platform, which used a built in asset exchange system dependent on proof-of-stake instead of proof-of-work.

Nxt was created with a total supply of one billion NXT. On 28 September 2013, BCNext created a forum thread announcing the proposed launch of NXT as a second-generation cryptocurrency and asked for small bitcoin donations to determine how to distribute the initial stake. On 18 November 2013, fundraising for NXT was closed.

The initial coin offering collected 21 bitcoins that were worth US$17,000.

=== New products (2014–2016) ===
On September 15, 2014, a tweet by one of Bitcoin's developers, Jeff Garzik, criticized the vulnerability of Nxt technology and the closed nature of the development process.

In 2014, the Danish virtual currency exchange CCEDK began allowing the trading of NXT for fiat currency. At the time, according to Reuters, NXT was the fourth largest cryptocurrency with a market cap of $45 million. It had about 20,000 active users.

NXT was covered extensively in the 2015 "Call for Evidence" report by ESMA.

In 2015, the developers of the game Voxelnauts planned to use Nxt to provide ownership rights of items in the game.

In July 2016, NXT launched Smart Transaction templates, which were meant to serve as building blocks for businesses to construct Blockchain solutions for particular problems.

=== Jelurida and Ardor (2016–2026) ===
In 2016, Lior Yaffe founded Jelurida, the software company behind the Nxt and Ardor blockchains. Ardor, which is built on Nxt technology, launched in 2018.

In December 2017, Business Insider ranked Nxt as the 29th of 29 cryptocurrencies with a market cap above $1 billion, with a market cap of $1.028 billion. Jelurida stewards of Nxt as of 2021.

As of 2026, according to the Jelurida website, Nxt is currently a child chain of Ardor. On January 17, 2026, generations of new blocks and transactions on the Nxt blockchain halted, at block 6 million. On February 1, 2026, the Nxt child chain was activated at block 4,333,333 on the Ardor chain. Nxt software and source code continued to be available under a public license.

== NXT cryptocurrency ==
The basic unit of account of the crypto platform is a cryptocurrency, which has the designation NXT. On July 29, 2014, Danish cryptocurrency exchange service CCEDK began offering NXT to fiat money for exchange.
