= Icertis =

American privately owned software company

- Website type: Private
- Founded: 2009
- Headquarters: Bellevue, Washington; United States
- Key people: Samir Bodas (co-founder, CEO); Monish Darda (co-founder, CTO)
- Industry: Internet Software and Services
- Products: Icertis Contract Intelligence (ICI)
- Employees: 1,700+
- Website: www.icertis.com

Icertis is an American privately owned software company that provides contract management software to enterprise businesses using a software-as-a-service model. The company, which was founded in 2009, is headquartered in Bellevue, Washington.

== Operations ==
Icertis is headquartered in Bellevue, Washington. The company has additional offices in North America, as well as in India and Europe. Icertis is a privately owned, venture capital-funded company with minority stakes held by Softbank and SAP. As of December 2021, it employed approximately 1,700 people.

== History ==
Icertis was co-founded in 2009 by Samir Bodas, former CEO of Aztecsoft, and Monish Darda, a former executive at BladeLogic.

== Technology ==
Icertis provides cloud-based software intended to digitize, organize, and centralize business contracts. The software is licensed to companies through a software-as-a-service model.

The company's flagship product, Icertis Contract Intelligence, is a contract lifecycle management platform, which allows a company to digitize and store all of its contracts in the cloud. The platform utilizes artificial intelligence (AI) technology to identify problematic contract clauses and flag potential compliance issues. Its machine learning capabilities can read contracts and offer insight.
