= Owkin =

French artificial intelligence company

- Industry: Biotechnology
- Founded: August 3, 2016
- Founder: Thomas Clozel, Gilles Wainrib
- Headquarters: Paris, France
- Area served: US, France, UK, Switzerland, Germany, Spain
- Products: K Pro, K Pro Free
- Services: Agentic AI platform for biopharma, AI drug discovery, AI drug development
- Number of employees: 250 (2026)
- Website: owkin.com

Owkin is a French-American artificial intelligence and biotech company that builds agentic AI to analyze data, identify new treatments, optimize clinical trials and develop AI diagnostics. The company uses multimodal patient data from academic institutions and hospitals to train its AI models for data analysis, drug discovery, and drug development. Owkin collaborates with pharmaceutical companies around the world to improve their therapeutic programs.

== History ==
Owkin was founded in Paris in 2016, by Thomas Clozel, a clinical research doctor and son of Jean-Paul and Martine Clozel founders of Swiss biotech Actelion, and Gilles Wainrib, a professor of artificial intelligence.

Owkin has raised over $308 million, and became a ‘unicorn’ – a startup valued at more than $1 billion – in November 2021 through a $180 million investment from French biopharma company Sanofi.

== Technologies ==
=== Agentic AI ===
Owkin uses agentic AI to support biomedical research by helping scientists “explore, refine, and validate” hypotheses. Their AI uses a single natural language interface that allows scientists to interact conversationally with the scientific literature and their data.

=== MOSAIC ===
MOSAIC (Multi Omic Spatial Atlas in Cancer) aims to build one of the largest spatial multiomics datasets in oncology and involves collaboration between Owkin, Nanostring Technologies, the University of Pittsburgh, Gustave Roussy, Lausanne University Hospital, Uniklinikum Erlangen/Friedrich-Alexander-Universität Erlangen-Nürnberg, and Charité-Universitätsmedizin Berlin.

=== OwkinZero ===
Owkin developed a biological reasoning AI model, OwkinZero, trained on a proprietary question and answer dataset created using its MOSAIC platform. In evaluations on biological reasoning tasks, OwkinZero outperformed several other large language models, including ChatGPT. Owkin's long-term research goal is to develop biological artificial super intelligence based on such models.

=== Federated learning ===
Owkin uses federated learning, a decentralized machine learning technique, to train machine learning models with multiple data providers. Federated learning allows data providers to collaborate without moving or sharing their data.

The MELLODDY project, an initiative that included Owkin, ten pharmaceutical companies, and six other partners, applied federated learning to train AI on datasets without having to share proprietary data. The aim was to improve drug discovery and they built a shared platform called MELLODDY (Machine Learning Ledger Orchestration for Drug Discovery). The first results of the project were published in July 2022.

=== Transfer learning ===
Transfer learning is a machine learning technique that allows a model pre-trained on one task to be used on another related task. Owkin uses transfer learning to work on very small datasets. Owkin's model (CHOWDER) is able to understand high-level graphic patterns, such as tumors, that are themselves relying on very low-level visual patterns, in order to fully learn the tumor's visual pattern.

== Products and services ==
=== KPro ===
K Pro is an intelligent research agent that uses artificial intelligence and multiomics data to support researchers' and scientists' efforts to expedite biomedical insights. It was first released in May 2025 and includes features such as user data upload, biomedical skills library, biological tissues visualization and cell-identification, data licensing, and data explorer.

== Partnerships ==
=== Amgen ===
Owkin collaborated with Amgen to test the ability of AI to improve cardiovascular prediction.

=== AstraZeneca ===
AstraZeneca partnered with Owkin in 2026 to build AI agents in addition to a three-year license for K Pro.

In 2024, Owkin and AstraZeneca partnered to develop an AI-powered tool specifically designed to prescreen for gBRCA mutations using digital pathology slides. Identifying mutations in the BRCA1 and BRCA2 genes plays an important role in identifying risk for developing certain types of cancers, including breast and ovarian. The tool aims to speed up and increase access to gBRCS testing.

=== Sanofi ===
Sanofi partnered with Owkin in 2026 to build AI agents in additions to a three-year license for K Pro.

In November 2021 Owkin entered a strategic alliance with Sanofi. The alliance included a $180 million equity investment, and a $90 million discovery and development partnership focused on Sanofi's oncology efforts in four different cancers. Sanofi used Owkin's technology to find new biomarkers and therapeutic targets, build prognostic models, and predict response to treatment.

=== Bristol-Myers Squibb ===
In June 2022, Owkin entered a strategic alliance with Bristol-Myers Squibb to help them design potentially more precise and efficient clinical trials. The collaboration initially focused on cardiovascular disease, and has the potential to expand into projects in other therapeutic areas.

=== MSD ===
In December 2023, Owkin entered a strategic alliance with MSD to develop and commercialize AI-powered digital pathology diagnostics for the EU market that could be used to identify patients suitable for immunotherapies.

=== Servier ===
In October 2023, Owkin and Servier started a multi-year partnership focused on developing "better-targeted therapies" in oncology and other disease areas. The partnership's first two projects were in translational medicine and digital pathology.

=== MOSAIC ===
MOSAIC was formed by Owkin, Nanostring Technologies, the University of Pittsburgh, Gustave Roussy, Lausanne University Hospital, Uniklinikum Erlangen/Friedrich-Alexander-Universität Erlangen-Nürnberg, and Charité-Universitätsmedizin Berlin. It uses spatial omics, multimodal patient data, and artificial intelligence, and aims to “offer unprecedented information on the structure of tumors” and guide new treatments.

== Publications ==
Owkin's research on AI/ML has led to a number of publications that focus on machine learning methodologies and the development of predictive models for different disease areas, mainly oncology.

1. Courtiol, Pierre et al. “Deep learning-based classification of mesothelioma improves prediction of patient outcome”, Nat Med 25, 1519–1525 (2019)
2. Schmauch, Benoît et al. “A deep learning model to predict RNA-Seq expression of tumours from whole slide images”, Nature Communications volume 11, Article number: 3877 (2020)
3. Jean Ogier du Terrail et al. “Federated learning for predicting histological response to neoadjuvant chemotherapy in triple-negative breast cancer" Nat Med (2023). 10.1038/s41591-022-02155
4. Saiilard et al., “Pacpaint: a histology-based deep learning model uncovers the extensive intratumor molecular heterogeneity of pancreatic adenocarcinoma” Nat Commun 14, 3459 (2023)
5. Saillard et al., “Validation of MSIntuit as an AI-based pre-screening tool for MSI detection from colorectal cancer histology slides” Nature Communications 14, 6695 (2023)
6. Saillard et al., "Predicting Survival After Hepatocellular Carcinoma Resection Using Deep Learning on Histological Slides" Hepatology 72 (2020)

== Awards ==
- 2019 AI For Health challenge
- 2020 Galien Foundation Best Digital Health Product Nominee
- 2021 Tech For Good Awards - “Health” category
- 2021 Member Recognition Awards from the French American Chamber of Commerce - Technology, Startups & Entrepreneurs Committee Awards
