= List of hash =

List of hash may refer to:

- Hash list
- List of hash functions
