= Pei Wei =

Pei Wei may refer to:

- Pei Wei (Jin dynasty) (267–300), Jin dynasty minister and xuanxue thinker
- Northern Wei (Chinese: 北魏; Wade–Giles: pei wei, 386–535), Xianbei-ruled dynasty during China's Northern and Southern dynasties period
- Pei Wei Asian Diner, American restaurant chain

== See also ==
- Pei-Yuan Wei, web browser pioneer
