= Ahto Buldas =

Estonian computer scientist (born 1967)

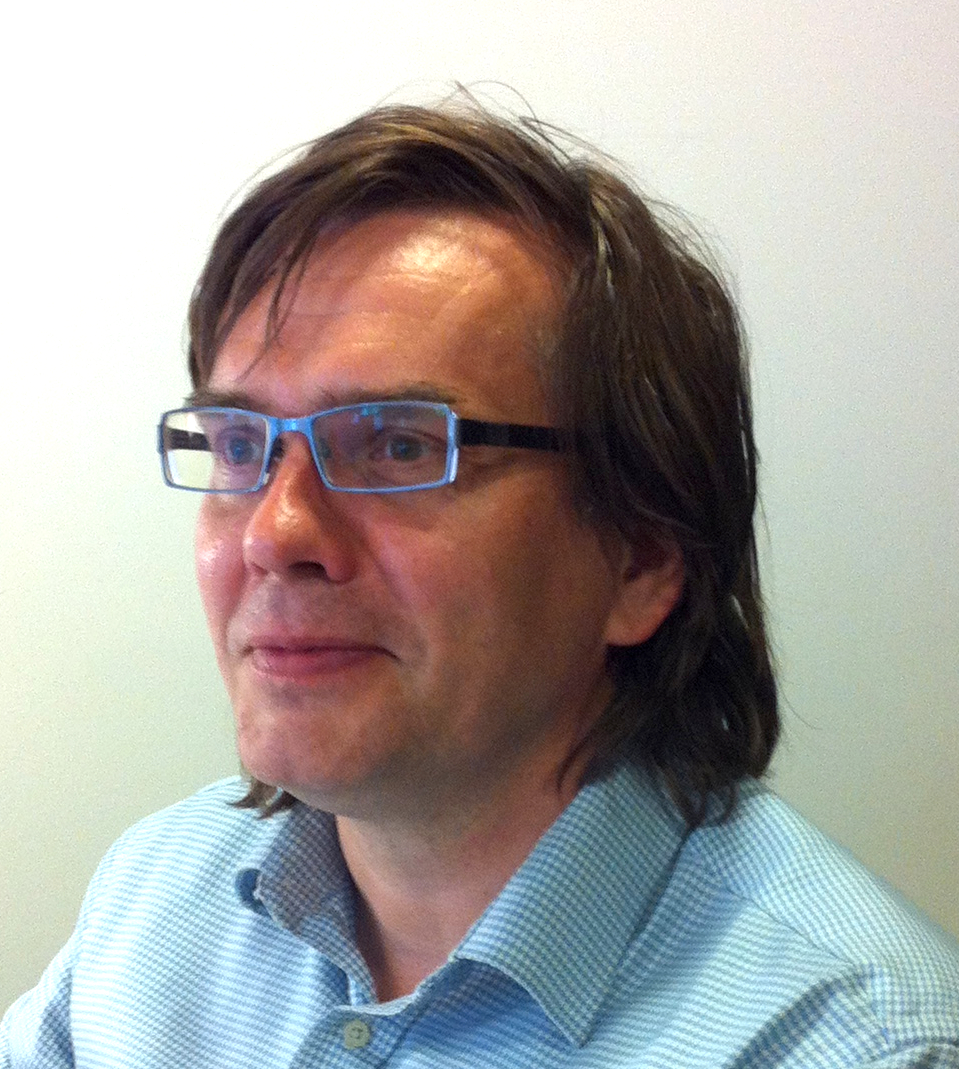
- Ahto Buldas, Tallinn, May 2013
- Born: 17 January 1967; Tallinn, then part of Estonian SSR, Soviet Union
- Education: Tallinn University of Technology
- Known for: Keyless Signature Infrastructure; Server-based signatures Linked Timestamping
- Scientific career
- Fields: Computer science
- Workplaces: Tallinn University of Technology and University of Tartu

Ahto Buldas (born 17 January 1967) is an Estonian computer scientist. He is the inventor of Keyless Signature Infrastructure, Co-Founder and Chief Scientist at Guardtime and Chair of the OpenKSI foundation.

== Life and education ==
Buldas was born in Tallinn. After graduating from high school, he was conscripted in to the Soviet Army where he spent 2 years as an artillery officer in Siberia. After being discharged, he started studies in Tallinn University of Technology, where he defended his MSc degree in 1993 and his PhD in 1999. He currently lives in Tallinn with his wife and four children.

== Career ==
Buldas was a leading contributor to the Estonian Digital Signature Act and ID-card from 1996 to 2002, currently the only national-level public-key infrastructure (PKI) which has achieved widespread adoption by a country's population for legally binding digital signatures. He published his first timestamping related research in 1998 and has published over 30 academic papers on the subject. His experience of implementing a national level PKI led him to invent Keyless Signature Infrastructure, a digital signature/timestamping system for electronic data that uses only hash-function based cryptography. By using hash-functions as the only cryptographic primitive the complexities of key management are eliminated and the system remains secure from quantum cryptographic attacks. His invention led to the founding of keyless signature technology company Guardtime in 2006.

He is the Chair of Information Security at Tallinn University of Technology. Buldas has been a supervisor for 15 MSc dissertations and 4 PhD theses.

== Awards ==
- 2002: Young Scientist Award by the Cultural Foundation of the President of Estonia.
- 2015: Order of the White Star, IV class.

== Academic work ==
Buldas has published over 30 academic papers in the fields of cryptography, digital signatures, and linked timestamping. His research focuses on hash-function-based cryptographic systems that remain secure against quantum cryptographic attacks. He has made significant contributions to the theory of server-based signatures and the mathematical foundations of Keyless Signature Infrastructure.

Selected publications:

- doi:10.1007/978-3-642-34266-0_6
- doi:10.1007/978-3-642-14081-5_20
- doi:10.1007/978-3-642-04642-1_19
- doi:10.1007/978-3-642-02620-1_19
- doi:10.1007/978-3-540-88733-1_18
- doi:10.1007/978-3-540-75670-5_9
- doi:10.1007/978-3-540-71677-8_11
