= Eolas =

American technology firm

- Type: Corporation
- Founded: 1994
- Founder: Michael Doyle
- Headquarters: Tyler, Texas, United States

Eolas (Irish pronunciation: [ˈoːl̪ˠəsˠ], meaning "Knowledge"; bacronym: "Embedded Objects Linked Across Systems") is a United States technology firm formed as a spin-off from the University of California, San Francisco (UCSF), in order to commercialize UCSF's patents for work done there by Eolas' co-founders, as part of the Visible Embryo Project. The company was founded in 1994 by Michael Doyle, Rachelle Tunik, David Martin, and Cheong Ang from the UCSF Center for Knowledge Management (CKM). The company was created at the request of UCSF, and was founded by the inventors of the university's patents.

In addition to the work done while at UCSF, Doyle has led work at Eolas, to create new technologies ranging from Spatial Genomics/Spatial transcriptomics, Code signing, transient-key cryptography, and blockchain to mobile AI assistants and automated audio conversation annotation.

The University of California, San Francisco CKM team created an advanced early web browser that supported plugins, streaming media, and cloud computing, which could provide seamless access to potentially-unlimited remote high-performance computational capabilities. They demonstrated it at Xerox PARC, in November 1993, at the second Bay Area SIGWEB meeting. The claim that the plug-in/applet functionality was an innovation, advanced to justify their patent application, has been contested by Pei-Yuan Wei, who developed the earlier Viola browser, which added scripted-app capabilities in 1992, a claim supported by Sir Tim Berners-Lee, inventor of the WWW, and other Web pioneers. Given only a short time to prepare, Wei was only able to demonstrate Viola's equivalent capabilities for local rather than remote files at the 2003 Eolas v. Microsoft trial, and thus fell short of proving prior art to the trial court's satisfaction. The case with Microsoft over patent 5,838,906 was settled in 2007 for a confidential amount of money after an initial $565 million judgment was stayed on appeal, but the University of California disclosed its piece of the final settlement as $30.4 million. In 2009 Eolas sued numerous other companies over patent number 7,599,985 in the United States District Court for the Eastern District of Texas. As of June 2011, a number of these companies, including Texas Instruments, Oracle and JPMorgan Chase, had signed licensing deals with Eolas, while the company continued to seek licenses from others.

In February 2012, an eight-person jury in the Eastern District of Texas invalidated some of the claims in the ’906 and ’985 patents, and in July 2012, Judge Leonard Davis ruled against Eolas. One year later, moreover, the US Court of Appeals for the Federal Circuit sustained that ruling.

However, after a new patent covering cloud computing on the Web was granted to Eolas in November 2015, Eolas filed a new lawsuit against Google, Amazon and Walmart, which is currently underway in the Northern District of California.

== Products ==
In September 1995, the founders of Eolas released WebRouser, an advanced Web browser based on Mosaic that implemented plugins, client-side image maps, web-page-defined browser buttons and menus, embedded streaming media, and cloud computing capabilities. In 2005, Eolas released 'Muse', a "multimedia doodling application," which it later licensed to Iconicast LLC, to use as the basis for an iOS app called 'HueTunes'. The HueTunes app was featured at the DEMO conference in 2013. In 2012, Eolas developed the Einstein Brain Atlas iPad app for the National Museum of Health and Medicine Chicago, which was named the Gizmodo App of the Day. According to the Eolas Web site, their current products include two health-education systems: the AnatLab Visible Human, used to teach gross anatomy to medical students, and AnatLab Histology, an iOS and Android app that provides mobile access to a complete collection of ultra-high-resolution histology microscopic slide images.

== Patents ==
US patent 5,838,906, titled "Distributed hypermedia method for automatically invoking external application providing interaction and display of embedded objects within a hypermedia document," was filed on October 17, 1994 and granted on November 17, 1998.

In Autumn 2003, the inventor of the World Wide Web and the Director of the W3C Consortium Tim Berners-Lee wrote to the Under Secretary of Commerce, asking for this patent to be invalidated, in order to "eliminate this major impediment to the operation of the Web". Leaders of Open Source Community sided with Microsoft in fighting the patent due to its threat to the free nature of the Web and to the basic established HTML standards. The specific concerns of having one company (Eolas) controlling a critical piece of the Web framework were cited.

In March 2004, the United States Patent and Trademark Office (USPTO) re-examined and initially rejected the patent. Eolas submitted a rebuttal in May 2004. On September 27, 2005, the USPTO upheld the validity of the patent. The PTO ruling rejected the relevance of Pei Wei's Viola code to the Eolas patent. According to the University of California press release, "In its 'Reasons for Patentability/Confirmation' notice, the patent examiner rejected the arguments for voiding UC's previously approved patent claims for the Web-browser technology as well as the evidence presented to suggest that the technology had been developed prior to the UC innovation. The examiner considered the Viola reference the primary reference asserted by Microsoft at trial as a prior art publication and found that Viola does 'not teach nor fairly suggest that instant 906 invention, as claimed.'"

Eolas was granted a second patent in October 2009 related to the same technology.

After considering the evidence asserted at the 2012 trial, including Viola, the US Patent Office granted Eolas a new patent in November 2015 with claims which generally cover cloud computing on the Web.

All of the above patents had expired by September 2017.

== Litigation ==
Microsoft declined to license the technology when it was offered to them (and others) in 1994.

In 1999, Eolas filed suit in the US District Court for the Northern District of Illinois against Microsoft over the validity and use of the patent. Eolas won the initial case in August 2003 and was awarded damages of $521 million from Microsoft for infringement. The District Court reaffirmed the jury's decision in January 2004.

In June 2004, Microsoft appealed the case to the Court of Appeals for the Federal Circuit. In March 2005, the District Court judgment was remanded, but the infringement and damages parts of the case were upheld. The appeals court ruled that the two Viola-related exhibits that had been thrown out of the original trial needed to be shown to a jury in a retrial. Microsoft quickly filed for a rehearing.

In October 2005, the Supreme Court of the United States refused to hear Microsoft's appeal, leaving intact the Federal Circuit Court of Appeals ruling in favor of Eolas with respect to foreign sales of Microsoft Windows. However, the remand to District Court had not been heard yet.

In May 2007, the USPTO agreed to allow Microsoft to argue ownership of the patent after they reissued a Microsoft patent that covers the same concepts as outlined in the Eolas patent, and contains wording that mirrors the Eolas patent. The USPTO ruled in favor of Eolas on that matter in September 2007.

Microsoft and Eolas agreed in July 2007 to delay a pending re-trial, in order to negotiate a settlement. On August 27, 2007, Eolas reported to its shareholders that a settlement had been reached and that Eolas expected to pay a substantial dividend as a result; the exact amount and terms of the settlement were not disclosed.

In October 2009, Eolas sued a number of large corporations for infringement of the same patent. The 22 sued corporations include Adobe, Amazon.com, Apple, Argosy Publishing, Blockbuster, CDW Corp., Citigroup, eBay, Frito-Lay, The Go Daddy Group, Google, J.C. Penney Co. Inc., JPMorgan Chase & Co., New Frontier Media Inc., Office Depot Inc., Perot Systems Corp., Playboy Enterprises International Inc., Rent-A-Center Inc., Staples Inc., Sun Microsystems Inc., Texas Instruments Inc., Yahoo! Inc., and YouTube LLC. Steven J. Vaughan-Nichols, writing in Computerworld's opinion section, called Eolas a patent troll after these lawsuits were initiated. As of June 2011, a number of these companies, including Texas Instruments, Oracle and JPMorgan Chase have signed licensing deals with Eolas, while others are still litigating.

In February 2012, a Texas jury found that some of the claims in two of Eolas' patents were invalid after testimony from several defendants including Tim Berners-Lee and Pei-Yuan Wei, credited as creator of the Viola browser. The testimony professed that the Viola browser included Eolas' claimed plugin invention before their conception date (September 7, 1993). There is "substantial evidence that Viola was publicly known and used" before the plaintiffs' alleged conception date, it added. The ruling effectively ended a pending lawsuit against Yahoo, Google, Amazon and JC Penney.

On July 23, 2013, the US Court of Appeals for the Federal Circuit, which has nationwide jurisdiction, affirmed a Texas federal court which had ruled in July 2012 that several claims relating to the two patents in the suit were invalid, a ruling which Eolas had appealed.

After the US Patent Office considered the evidence asserted at the 2012 trial, including Viola, it granted Eolas a new patent in November 2015 with claims which generally cover cloud computing on the Web. Eolas then filed a new lawsuit against Google, Amazon and Walmart. A 2022 Federal court ruling invalidated the cloud computing patent, saying the patent covered only abstract ideas. Eolas appealed the ruling, but the lower court's ruling was upheld. In October 2024, the Supreme Court of the United States declined to hear a further challenge by Eolas to the lower court ruling.

== Effects on other browsers ==
In February 2006, Microsoft modified its Internet Explorer web browser to attempt to side-step the Eolas patent. The change, first discussed in 2003, requires users to click once on an ActiveX control to "activate" it before they could use its interface. The specific message is "Click to activate this control", shown as a tooltip when the cursor is held over the embedded object. However, following a November 2007 announcement that Microsoft had "licensed the technologies from Eolas", in April 2008, Microsoft released an update which removed the click-to-activate functionality, reverting the software to its original design.

In June 2006, Opera Software released version 9 of its Opera browser for Windows and other operating systems, with modifications similar to Microsoft's.

Doyle has stated that Eolas will offer royalty-free licenses to non-commercial entities. A statement on Eolas' web site clarifies the company's policy with regard to such licenses. As of 2020, Mozilla Foundation, which develops the open-source Mozilla Firefox browser, has not announced that it has requested any license to the Eolas patents; the last of these patents expired prior to the end of 2017.

=== Proposed Workarounds ===
Before some claims in the company's patents were invalidated in 2012, one proposed workaround was to dynamically create the HTML element containing the plug-in using JavaScript, rather than embedding it on the page. In this situation, Internet Explorer did not ask the user for an "activation" click because of the infringers' argument that the patent did not cover embedded scripting.

Opera users could use User JavaScript functionality in the browser to attempt to work around this issue in a similar way with locally modified JavaScript.

== See also ==
- Software patent
- List of software patents
- Microsoft litigation
- Inventor
