= Pei-Yuan Wei =

Computer programmer

Pei-Yuan Wei (Chinese: 魏培源; pinyin: Wèi Péiyuán; d. 2023) was a Taiwanese-American businessman who created ViolaWWW, the first popular graphical web browser.

== Career ==
Pei-Yuan Wei was born in Pingtung County, Taiwan. He graduated from Berkeley High School in 1986. He received his bachelor's degree from the University of California, Berkeley, and was a member of the student club, the eXperimental Computing Facility (XCF).

In the 1990s, Wei was a founding employee of Global Network Navigator, one of the first Internet-based businesses. Later he worked for various Palm OS-related businesses. Since 2008, Perry has lived in both Taiwan and the US, devoting most of his time to taking care of his ill family member.

== Controversy ==
Pei-Yuan Wei was at the center of a controversy over patents relating to embedded objects in a web browser, which revolves around whether his browser, ViolaWWW, had the capability to launch embedded objects, prior to the date a patent was filed by Michael David Doyle of Eolas, and the University of California. If it did, it would constitute prior art, which may invalidate the patent issued to Eolas. If it did not, in addition to major financial penalties against such companies as Microsoft, the way the World Wide Web and the way browsers that surf it work may be forced to change.

Eolas' claim was eventually found invalid by a Texas court.
