= NanoString Technologies =

Biotechnology company

NanoString Technologies, Inc
- Industry: Biotechnology
- Founded: 2003
- Founders: Krassen Dimitrov, Amber Ratcliffe, Dwayne Dunaway
- Fate: Purchased by Bruker and incorporated into Bruker Spatial Biology
- Headquarters: Bothell, Washington, United States
- Products: nCounter® Analysis System, GeoMx® Digital Spatial Profiler, CosMx ™ Spatial Molecular Imager, AtoMx ™ Spatial Informatics Portal
- Brands: nCounter®, GeoMx® DSP
- Parent: Bruker Corporation
- Website: nanostring.com

NanoString Technologies, Inc. was a biotechnology company focused on discovery and translational research. It is now part of Bruker Spatial Biology.

Products launched by NanoString Technologies include the nCounter Gene Expression System, the GeoMx Digital Spatial Profiler, the CosMx Spatial Molecular Imager, and the AtoMx Spatial Informatics Platform. These systems enable scientists to explore high-plex expression of genes and proteins in the context of tissue structure. NanoString products are based on a novel digital molecular barcoding technology invented at the Institute for Systems Biology in Seattle under the direction of Dr. Leroy Hood.

== History ==
The original patent forming the basis for the nCounter Analysis System was invented and licensed by The Institute for Systems Biology. The business plan was written by Amber Ratcliffe and Aaron Coe and won seed funding in multiple business plan competitions. NanoString was spun out of The Institute for Systems Biology and founded as a separate company in 2003 by Krassen Dimitrov, Amber Ratcliffe, and Dwayne Dunaway. In 2008, NanoString launched the nCounter Analysis System and began international sales operations with its first multiplexed assays for gene expression analysis.

In 2009, Perry Fell, who had been CEO since 2004, left the company abruptly without official explanation. Between 2009 and 2010, the company operated with an acting CEO, Wayne Burns. Brad Gray, a former Genzyme executive, was hired as president and CEO in 2010.

As of June 2010, the company was not yet profitable. In an interview, Gray suggested that NanoString would begin to develop clinical diagnostics. As of July 2012, NanoString began indicating a move towards becoming a public company by hiring several senior staff with public company experience. In 2013, the company's IPO raised funding to expand NanoString sales and marketing.

NanoString's first spatial biology platform, the GeoMx DSP, was launched in 2019. Their second spatial biology platform, the CosMx Spatial Molecular Imager (SMI), was announced in February 2022, enabling multiplexed detection of RNA and protein at single-cell resolution in tissue. Commercial shipments of CosMx and its companion AtoMx Spatial Informatics Platform began in December 2022.

On February 4, 2024, NanoString Technologies filed for Chapter 11 bankruptcy after laying off 20% of its workforce in October 2023. The company began exploring options to support its restructuring, including a potential sale of itself.

On April 19, 2024, the sale of NanoString Technologies to the Bruker Corporation was approved and later that month Bruker announced a definitive acquisition agreement had been entered between the companies. Bruker acquired the assets and rights associated with NanoString's business for $392.6 million in cash. Following the acquisition, Bruker formed Bruker Spatial Biology, a new division comprising the assets from NanoString, Canopy Biosciences, and Bruker Spatial Genomics (formerly known as Acuity Spatial Genomics).

== Technology and products ==
The term "NanoString" was originally used to describe a specific barcoded probe—a piece of DNA carrying a linear sequence of fluorophores—developed in the early 2000s at the Institute for Systems Biology. These "nanostrings" were stretched onto a surface, imaged, and counted for direct digital detection of nucleic acids. After the technology was commercialized, NanoString Technologies became the name of the company as well as the broader platform brand, while the instrument itself was marketed as the nCounter Analysis System. Consequently, in scientific literature the term "NanoString" may variously refer to the probes, the nCounter platform, or the company. Some of their products include the nCounter Analysis System, which profiles hundreds of genes, proteins, miRNAs, or copy number variations, and the CosMx Spatial Molecular Imager, which allows researchers to map single cells in their native environments.
