= ISO/IEC 18014 =

International standard

ISO/IEC 18014 Information technology — Security techniques — Time-stamping services is an international standard that specifies time-stamping techniques. It comprises four parts:

- Part 1: Framework
- Part 2: Mechanisms producing independent tokens
- Part 3: Mechanisms producing linked tokens
- Part 4: Traceability of time sources

== Part 1: Framework ==
In this first part of ISO/IEC 18014, several things are explained and developed:

- The identification of the objectives of a time authority.
- The description of a general model on which time stamping services are based.
- The definition of time stamping services.
- The definition of the basic protocols of time stamping.
- The specifications of the protocols between the involved entities.

Key words: audit, non-repudiation, security, time-stamp

== Part 2: Mechanisms producing independent tokens ==
A time-stamping service provides evidence that a data item existed before a certain point in time. Time-stamp services produce time-stamp tokens, which are data structures containing a verifiable cryptographic binding between a data item's representation and a time-value. This part of ISO/IEC 18014 defines time-stamping mechanisms that produce independent tokens, which can be verified one by one.

== Part 3: Mechanisms producing linked tokens ==
This part of ISO/IEC 18014:

- Describes a general model for time-stamping services producing linked tokens.
- Describes the basic components used to construct a time-stamping service of this type.
- Defines the data structures used to interact with a time-stamping service of this type.
- Describes specific instances of such time-stamping services.
