= Electronic signatures and law =

Many states and legal jurisdictions have adopted legislation concerning the validity and effects of electronic signatures, including cryptographic digital signatures. Article 7 of the United Nations Commission on International Trade Law's Model Law on Electronic Commerce addresses electronic signatures, providing wording intended to harmonise legal provisions in their field in order to promote international trade, and the Commission's Model Law on Electronic Signatures (2001) is a strong influence in this field.

Examples of legislation by state or jurisdiction include:

== Argentina ==
- Ley Nº 25.506 (B.O. 14/12/2001).
- Decreto Nº 2628/02 (B.O. 20/12/2002).
- Decreto N° 724/06 (B.O. 13/06/06).
- Decisión Administrativa N° 927/14 (B.O. 03/11/14).

== Bermuda ==
- eSignature technology and electronic document solutions

== Brazil ==
- Medida provisória 2.200-2 (Portuguese) - Brazilian law states that any digital document is valid for the law if it is certified by ICP-Brasil (the official Brazilian PKI) or if it is certified by another PKI and the concerned parties agree as to the validity of the document.

== Canada ==
- Under the Personal Information Protection and Electronic Documents Act 2000 (PIPEDA), Canadian law distinguishes between the generic "electronic signature" and a "secure electronic signature". Federal secure electronic signature regulations make it clear that a secure electronic signature is a digital signature created and verified in a specific manner.
- Canada's Evidence Act contains evidentiary presumptions about both the integrity and validity of electronic documents with attached secure electronic signatures, and of the authenticity of the secure electronic signatures themselves.

== China ==
- Electronic Signature Law of the People's Republic of China (Chinese/English) - The stated purposes include standardizing the conduct of electronic signatures, confirming the legal validity of electronic signatures and safeguarding the legal interests of parties involved in such matters. This law was revised on 23 April 2019 with immediate effect. The revision involves the deletion of the reference to land conveyancing transactions in Article 3, which provides for types of transaction exempted from the law. Accordingly, land conveyancing agreements can now be executed electronically.

== Colombia ==
- LEY 527 DE 1999 (agosto 18) por medio de la cual se define y reglamenta el acceso y uso de los mensajes de datos, del comercio electrónico y de las firmas digitales, y se establecen las entidades de certificación y se dictan otras disposiciones.
- DECRETO 2364 DE 2012 (Noviembre 22) por medio del cual se reglamenta el artículo 7° de la Ley 527 de 1999, sobre la firma electrónica y se dictan otras disposiciones.
- Decree 333 of 2014, regulates accreditation procedures for Certification Entities, who certify digital signatures.

== European Union and the European Economic Area ==
=== Before eIDAS ===
European Union (EU) Directive establishing the framework for electronic signatures:

- Directive 1999/93/EC of the European Parliament and of the Council of 13 December 1999 on a Community framework for electronic signatures. This Directive was repealed on 1 July 2016 and superseded by the eIDAS regulation (see its article 48).
- Commission Decision 2003/511/EC adopting three CEN Workshop Agreements as technical standards presumed to be in accordance with the Directive
- Implementing laws: Several countries have already implemented the Directive 1999/93/EC.
  - Austria
    - Signature Law, 2000
  - Belgium
    - Signature Law, 2001
  - Czech Republic
    - Act on Electronic Signatures, 227/2000
  - Denmark
    - Lov om elektroniske signaturer
  - England, Scotland and Wales (see below)
  - Estonia
    - Digital signature in Estonia
    - Digital Signature Law, 2000 (in Estonian).
    - Digital Signatures Act (consolidated text Dec 2003)
  - Finland
    - Laki vahvasta sähköisestä tunnistamisesta ja sähköisistä allekirjoituksista, 2009 (in Finnish)
  - France
    - Articles 1363-1368 of the Civil Code (French)
  - Germany
    - German Signature Law of 2001, changed in 2005
  - Greece
    - Presidential Decree 150/2001 (in Greek)
  - Hungary
    - Hungarian Act on Electronic Signatures 2001
  - Iceland
    - Lög um rafrænar undirskriftir nr. 28/2001
  - Ireland, Republic of
    - Irish Electronic Commerce Act, 2000
  - Italy
    - Decreto legislativo 7/3/2005, n. 82 (Codice dell'Amministrazione Digitale)
  - Latvia
    - Electronic Documents Law, 2002
    - Electronic Documents Law, 2002 (in Latvian)
  - Lithuania
    - Law on electronic signature, 2014 (in Lithuanian)
    - Law on electronic signature, 2002 (in English, not relevant in law)
  - Luxembourg
    - Loi du 14 août 2000 relative au commerce électronique, 2000 (in French)
  - Malta
    - Maltese Electronic Commerce Act 2001, last amended 2005
  - Netherlands
    - article23
  - Norway
    - Electronic Signature Act, 2001 (in Norwegian).
  - Poland
    - act_on_eSignature.pdf
  - Portugal
    - Directive 1999/93/EC on electronic signatures was implemented by Portuguese Decree-Law 62/2003 of 3 April 2003. This Decree-Law amended Decree-Law 290-D/99 of 2 August 1999, the previous law governing electronic signatures.
  - Romania
    - Legea semnăturii electronice, 455/2001 (in Romanian)
    - Law on the Electronic Signature, 455/2001 (unofficial translation) (in English)
  - Slovakia
    - Act no.215/2002 on electronic signature (in Slovak)
  - Slovenia
    - Electronic Business and Electronic Signature Act (in Slovene)
  - Spain
    - Ley 6/2020, de 11 de noviembre, reguladora de determinados aspectos de los servicios electrónicos de confianza (in Spanish)
  - Sweden
    - Qualified Electronic Signatures Act (SFS 2000:832) (in Swedish)
    - SFS 2000:832 in English translation

=== eIDAS ===
In the EU, electronic signatures and related trust services are regulated by the Regulation (EU) N°910/2014 on electronic identification and trust services for electronic transactions in the internal market (eIDAS Regulation). This regulation was adopted by the Council of the European Union on 23 July 2014. It became effective on 1 July and repealed the Electronic Signatures Directive 1999/93/EC. At the same date, any laws of EU member states that were inconsistent with eIDAS were also automatically repealed, replaced or modified. In contract to the aforementioned directive (which allowed the EU member states to interpret it and transpose it to their own law) the eIDAS Regulation is directly effective in all member states.

== Ghana ==
- Electronic Transactions Act, 2008, sections 10-14, Act 772 of the Ghanaian Parliament.

== Guatemala ==
- Ley para el Reconocimiento de las Comunicaciones y Firmas Electrónicas (in Spanish)

== India ==
- Information Technology Act, 2000

== Indonesia ==
- Art. 12 Law No.11/2008 on Electronic Informations and Transactions (in Indonesian), for general purposes.
- Art. 97B Law No. 13/2022 in regards of Second Amendment of Law No. 12/2011 on Law Formulation (in Indonesian), for government purposes.

== Israel ==
- Electronic Signature Law, 5761–2001

== Japan ==
- Law Concerning Electronic Signatures and Certification Services, 2000 (in Japanese)

== Korea ==
- Digital Signature Act, Act No. 17354, jun. 9, 2020 (in English) For reference only. No legal or official effect.
- Digital Signature Act (in Korean)

== Malaysia ==
- Digital Signature Act (Act 562), 1997 (in Bahasa Malaysia).
- Digital Signature Act (Act 562), 1997 (in English).
- Digital Signature Regulations (P.U.(A) 359), 1998 (in Bahasa Malaysia).
- Digital Signature Regulations (P.U.(A) 359), 1998 (in English).

== Maldives ==
- Electronic Transactions Act 2/2022 (in Dhivehi)

== México ==
- Law of Electronic Signatures (LFEA), 2012 (in Spanish)

== Moldova ==
- Lege cu privire la documentul electronic şi semnătura digitală, 15 July 2004 (in Romanian)
- Law about Electronic Document and Digital Signature (in Russian)

== New Zealand ==
- Electronic Transactions Act 2002, sections 22-24
- For an overview of the New Zealand law, see:

- The Laws of New Zealand, Electronic Transactions, paras 16-18; or
- Commercial Law, paras 8A.7.1-8A.7.4. (These sources are available on the LexisNexis subscription-only website)

== Peru ==
- Ley Nº 27269. Ley de Firmas y Certificados Digitales (28MAY2000) (in Spanish)

== Philippines ==
- Electronic Commerce Act of 2000

== Russian Federation ==
- Federal Law of Russian Federation about Electronic Signature (06.04.2011)

== Singapore ==
- Electronic Transactions Act

== South Africa ==
- Electronic Communications and Transactions Act, 2002 (PDF)

== Switzerland ==
- Federal Law on Certification Services Concerning the Electronic Signature, 2003

== Ukraine ==
- Law On Electronic Digital Signature, 2003 (in Ukrainian), valid until 7 November 2018.
- Law On Electronic Trust Services, 2017 (in Ukrainian), valid since 7 November 2018.

== United Kingdom ==
Directive 1999/93/EC on electronic signatures, Commission Decision 2003/511/EC and the eIDAS regulation (see above) applied whilst the UK was a member state of the European Union. Domestic legislation includes:

- Electronic Communications Act, 2000
- The Electronic Signatures Regulations 2002.

A Law Commission report in 2019 confirmed that the law in England and Wales allows the use of electronic signatures, "both where there is a statutory requirement for a signature and where there is not".

== United States ==
=== Legislation ===
- Uniform Electronic Transactions Act (UETA)
- Electronic Signatures in Global and National Commerce Act (E-SIGN), at 15 U.S.C. 7001 et seq. The law permits the use of electronic signatures in many situations, and preempts many state laws that would otherwise limit the use of electronic signatures.

=== Case law ===
Court decisions discussing the effect and validity of digital signatures or digital signature-related legislation:

- In re Piranha, Inc., 2003 WL 21468504 (N.D. Tex) (UETA does not preclude a person from contesting that he executed, adopted, or authorized an electronic signature that is purportedly his).
- Cloud Corp. v. Hasbro, 314 F.3d 289 (7th Circuit, 2002) EMLF.org (E-SIGN does not apply retroactively to contracts formed before it took effect in 2000. Nevertheless, the statute of frauds was satisfied by the text of E-mail plus an (apparently) written notation.)
- Sea-Land Service, Inc. v. Lozen International, 285 F.3d 808 (9th Circuit, 2002) Admiraltylawguide.com (Internal corporate E-mail with signature block, forwarded to a third party by another employee, was admissible over hearsay objection as a party-admission, where the statement was apparently within the scope of the author's and forwarder's employment.)

== Uruguay ==
Uruguay's laws include both electronic and digital signatures:

- Concerning passwords or adequate information technology gestures
- Concerning electronic and digital signature and PKI

== Turkey ==
Turkey has had an electronic signature Law since 2004. This law is stated in European Union Directive 1999/93/EC. Turkey has a Government Certificate Authority - Kamu SM for all government agents for their internal use and three independent certificate authorities all of which are issuing qualified digital signatures.

- Kamu Sertifikasyon Merkezi (Governmental Certificate Authority) Kamusm.gov.tr (in Turkish)
- E-Güven (owned by Turkish Informatics Foundation) E-guven.com (in Turkish)
- Turktrust (owned by Turkish Military Force Solidarity Foundation) Turktrust.com.tr (in Turkish)
- E-Tugra E-tugra.com (in Turkish)
