= BaaS =

BaaS may refer to:

- Banking as a service
- Backend as a service
- Blockchain as a service
- Battery as a service

== See also ==
- Baas, a Dutch surname
