= CSS (disambiguation) =

CSS, or Cascading Style Sheets, is a language used to describe the style of document presentations in web development.

CSS may also refer to:

== Computing and telecommunications ==
- Chirp spread spectrum, a modulation concept, part of the standard IEEE 802.15.4aCSS
- Closed source software, software that is not distributed with source code; also known as proprietary software
- Computational social science, academic sub-disciplines concerned with computational approaches to the social sciences
- Content Scramble System, an encryption algorithm in DVDs
- Content Services Switch, a family of load balancers produced by Cisco
- CSS code, a type of error-correcting code in quantum information theory

== Arts and entertainment ==
- Campus SuperStar, a popular Singapore school-based singing competition
- Chicken Soup for the Soul, an American publisher
- Closed Shell Syndrome, a fictional disease in the Ghost in the Shell television series
- Comcast/Charter Sports Southeast, a defunct southeast U.S. sports cable television network
- Counter-Strike: Source, an online first-person shooter computer game
- CSS (band), Cansei de Ser Sexy, a Brazilian electro-rock band

== Government ==
- Canadian Survey Ship, of the Canadian Hydrographic Service
- Center for Strategic Studies in Iran
- Central Security Service, the military component of the US National Security Agency
- Central Superior Services of Pakistan
- Chicago South Shore and South Bend Railroad, a U.S. railroad
- Committee for State Security (Bulgaria), a former name for the Bulgarian secret service
- KGB, the Committee for State Security, the Soviet Union's security agency
- Supreme Security Council of Moldova, named Consiliul Suprem de Securitate (CSS) in Romanian

== Military ==
- Center for Service Support
- Combat service support
- Combat sidestroke, a swimming stroke used by Navy SEALs
- Confederate Secret Service, the secret service operations of the Confederate States of America during the American Civil War
- Confederate States Ship, a ship of the historical naval branch of the Confederate States armed forces
- Dongfeng missile, a Chinese surface-to-surface missile system (NATO designation code CSS)
- Combat stores ship, Ships that provides supplies and propulsion and aviation fuel to combatant ships

== Schools and education ==
- Centennial Secondary School (disambiguation)
- Certificat de Sécurité Sauvetage, the former name of Certificat de formation à la sécurité, the French national degree required to be flight attendant in France
- Chilliwack Secondary School, British Columbia, Canada
- Clementi Secondary School, Hong Kong SAR, China
- College of Social Studies, at Wesleyan University, Middletown, Connecticut, USA
- College of St. Scholastica, Duluth, Minnesota, USA
- Colorado Springs School, Colorado Springs, CO, USA
- Columbia Secondary School, New York, NY, USA
- Commonwealth Secondary School, Jurong East, Singapore
- Courtice Secondary School, Courtice, Canada
- Crockett State School, juvenile correctional facility in Crockett, Texas, USA
- CSS Profile, College Scholarship Service Profile, a U.S. student aid application form

== Space ==
- Chinese space station, a modular space station project
- Catalina Sky Survey, an astronomical survey
- Commercial space station
- Control stick steering, a method of flying the Space Shuttle manually

== Other organisations ==
- CS Sfaxien, a Tunisian sport club
- Comcast/Charter Sports Southeast, a cable-exclusive regional sports television network
- Confederation of Sahel States, a confederation in Africa
- Citizens Signpost Service, a body of the European Commission
- Community Service Society of New York
- Congregation of the Sacred Stigmata, or Stigmatines, a Catholic religious order
- Cryptogamic Society of Scotland, a Scottish botanical research society

== Medicine and health science ==
- Cancer-specific survival, survival rates specific to cancer type
- Cytokine storm syndrome
- Churg–Strauss syndrome, a type of autoimmune vasculitis, also known as eosinophilic granulomatosis with polyangiitis
- Cross-sectional study, a study collecting data across a population at one point in time
- Coronary steal syndrome, the syndrome resulting from the blood flow problem called coronary steal
- Carotid sinus syndrome (carotid sinus syncope)—see Carotid sinus § Disease of the carotid sinus

== Other uses ==
- Capital1 Solar Spikers, a Philippine women's volleyball team
- Capital1 Solar Strikers, a Philippine women's football club
- Chessington South railway station, a National Rail station code in England
- Chicago South Shore and South Bend Railroad, a freight railroad between Chicago, Illinois, and South Bend, Indiana
- Cignal Super Spikers, Philippine volleyball teams owned by Cignal
  - Cignal Super Spikers (women)
  - Cignal Super Spikers (men)
- Combined Charging System, a standard for electrical vehicle charging stations
- Constant surface speed, a mode of machine tool operation, an aspect of speeds and feeds
- Context-sensitive solutions, in transportation planning
- Customer satisfaction survey, a tool used in customer satisfaction research
- Cyclic steam stimulation, an oil field extraction technique; see Steam injection (oil industry)
- Cab Signaling System, a train protection system
- Close-space sublimation, a method for producing thin film solar cells, esp. Cadmium telluride
- Competition Scratch Score, an element of the golf handicapping system in the United Kingdom and Republic of Ireland
- The ISO 639-3 code for Southern Ohlone, also known as Costanoan, an indigenous language or language family spoken in California
- Chowk Sarwar Shaheed (CSS), a city in Punjab, Pakistan
- Comparison Shopping Service, a Google-approved Comparison shopping website

== See also ==
- Cross-site scripting (XSS)
