= BSN =

BSN may refer to:

== Broadcasters ==
- Bally Sports North, Midwestern United States
- Broadcasting System of Niigata, Japan

== Businesses and organisations ==
- Badan Standardisasi Nasional, an Indonesian standardization agency
- Bank Simpanan Nasional, Malaysia
- Biotechnology Society of Nepal
- Boussois-Souchon-Neuvesel, French company, renamed Groupe Danone in 1994
- Boy Scouts of Nippon, a former name of the Scout Association of Japan
- The British School in the Netherlands, The Hague

== Sport ==
- Baloncesto Superior Nacional, a Puerto Rican basketball league
- Blue Square North, an English football league

== Technologies ==
- Blockchain-based Service Network, China
- Body sensor network

== Other uses ==
- Bachelor of Science in Nursing, a nursing degree
- Burgerservicenummer, the national identification number in the Netherlands
