= CEN Workshop Agreement =

A CEN Workshop Agreement (commonly abbreviated CWA) is a reference document from the European Committee for Standardization (CEN). It is, by definition, not an official standard from the member organizations.

In the field of electronic signatures, several CWAs exist. In July 2003 the European Commission granted the following three CWAs status as generally recognized technical standards, presumed to be in accordance with the Electronic Signatures Directive (1999/93/EC):

- CWA 14167-1 (June 2003): security requirements for trustworthy systems managing certificates for electronic signatures — Part 1: System Security Requirements
- CWA 14167-2 (March 2004): security requirements for trustworthy systems managing certificates for electronic signatures — Part 2: cryptographic module for CSP signing operations — Protection Profile (MCSO-PP)
- CWA 14169 (March 2004): secure signature creation devices.

Other CWA deals with e-signature; among them:

- CWA 14170 Signature Creation Process and Environment.
- CWA 14171 Signature Validation Process and Environment.
