= Baas =

Baas:

- An Afrikaans word for boss and Dutch word for supervisor/leader/master, from which the English word "boss" is derived

== Surname ==
- Balduin Baas (1922–2006), German actor
- David Baas (born 1981), American football center
- Gilberto Keb Baas (born 1977), Mexican boxer
- Heinz Baas (1922–1994), German football player and manager
- Ian Baas (born 1982), American race car driver
- Jan Baas (born 1950), Dutch politician
- Justin Baas (born 2000), Filipino footballer
- Johann Hermann Baas (1838–1909), German medical historian
- Lourens Baas Becking (1895–1963), Dutch botanist and microbiologist
- Maarten Baas (born 1978), Dutch industrial designer
- Pieter Baas (1944–2024), Dutch botanist
- Stien Baas-Kaiser (1938–2022), Dutch speed skater

== See also ==
- Banking as a service
- Blockchain as a service
- Backend as a service
- May refer to Dutch film Brammetje Baas
- Plural of "baa", see Baa (disambiguation)
- BAAS (disambiguation)
- Bas (disambiguation)
