= CSS3 (disambiguation) =

CSS3 is an abbreviation for Cascading Style Sheets, level 3, a declarative stylesheet language for structured documents.

CSS3 may also mean:

- CSS3, the ICAO airport code for Montréal/Les Cèdres Airport
- CSS-3 (also known as the Dong Feng 4 or DF-4), a land-based ballistic medium-range missile of the People's Republic of China

== See also ==
- CSS (disambiguation)
