= Blockchain-based Service Network =

Chinese blockchain network

The Blockchain-based Service Network (BSN) is a backend architecture in China for developing and managing blockchain-based applications, and is split into Chinese and International uses. BSN China, designed as the backbone of China's blockchain strategy, was established in 2018 and launched in 2020 by the State Information Center under the National Development and Reform Commission of China, China Mobile, China UnionPay (state-owned payment and settlement provider), and a technology architect. BSN International operates under the Singapore-based BSN Foundation.

The BSN integrates both private and public blockchain frameworks and cloud service providers to build the underlying development and production environment, where enterprises, governmental bodies, and financial institutions can build Blockchain-as-a-Service Systems and blockchain applications while being compliant with China's regulations of non-cryptocurrencies. BSN International draws on Amazon Web Services data centers in Hong Kong, California, and Paris, while BSN China utilizes Chinese domestic cloud infrastructure provided by China Mobile, China Telecom, and Baidu AI Cloud.

China's state-level decentralized identifier system, China RealDID, is deployed on BSN China.

As a digital infrastructure along the Belt and Road Initiative, the BSN works on interoperability across blockchain systems and develops a public IT system/multi-party system concept that uses blockchain as an operating system, including permissioned and permissionless blockchain infrastructures, such as Ethereum, Hyperledger and EOS.

In Sep 2022, BSN Spartan Network was launched in Hong Kong, targeting users outside of mainland China.

On November 8, 2023, BSN was listed in a US House of Representatives proposed bill aimed at preventing US federal agencies from utilizing China-developed blockchain networks or engaging with related companies due to national security concerns.

== See also ==
- Blockchain technology
- China's Belt and Road Initiative
- Digital currency in China
- Interoperability in computing
- Cloud computing
- Blockchain as a Service (BaaS)
- Blockchain-based database
