= Citizens Signpost Service =

Citizens Signpost Service is the former name of what is now Your Europe Advice, a body of the European Commission that assists European citizens to assert their European Union rights. As an assistance service it is part of the Single Digital Gateway. The service is free of charge, and queries are answered by legal experts in the citizens' own language. Citizens are advised on ways of obtaining solutions to their problems, or referred to the Solvit network for effective problem-solving.
