= China RealDID =

China's national-level decentralized identifier system

China Real-Name Decentralized Identifier System (China RealDID, Chinese: 实名DID) is China's national-level decentralized identifier system. China RealDID was officially launched on December 12, 2023, by the First Research Institute of China's Ministry of Public Security and the Blockchain-based Service Network (BSN) China.

China RealDID was developed as a real-name identity verification system based on blockchain technology, including real name verification, data encryption for personal data protection, secure private logins, business identity checks, and personal identification certificate services. It allows Chinese residents to access online services using DID addresses and private keys, maintaining anonymity with business platform operators while upholding real-name compliance in accordance with Chinese legislation that requires real-name registration for online accounts.

In November 2024, China RealDID underwent trials in Hong Kong, allowing Mainland Chinese citizens traveling to the city to verify their identities across borders while maintaining anonymity in KYC processes for purchasing regulated stablecoin and tokenized financial products without presenting a physical ID.

Anicert, a wholly owned subsidiary of the Ministry's First Research Institute, oversees the issuance, management, and verification of user identities for over 1.4 billion Chinese citizens through its Cyber Trusted Identity (CTID) system, which is already in use for identify checks within China by banks and other institutions.

BSN China's Yan'an Chain, launched on June 9, 2023, functions as the underlying open and transparent blockchain environment.

== See also ==
- Self-sovereign identity
- Identity-based security
- EU: eIDAS compatible European Self-Sovereign Identity Framework (ESSIF)
- USA: Electronic Signatures in Global and National Commerce Act
- Internet real-name system in China
