= BAAS =

BAAS may refer to:

- Bachelor of Applied Arts and Sciences, a bachelor's degree offered at some universities
- British Association for the Advancement of Science, now the British Science Association
- British Association for American Studies
- Bulletin of the American Astronomical Society

== See also ==
- Baas, a surname
