= Uniform Electronic Transactions Act =

U.S. model state law

The Uniform Electronic Transactions Act (UETA) is one of the several United States Uniform Acts proposed by the National Conference of Commissioners on Uniform State Laws (NCCUSL). Forty-nine states, the District of Columbia, and the U.S. Virgin Islands have adopted the UETA. Its purpose is to harmonize state laws concerning retention of paper records (especially checks) and the validity of electronic signatures.

== Overview ==
The act was approved by the National Conference of Commissioners on Uniform State Laws (NCCUSL) and is adopted on a state-by-state basis giving them the option to accept or reject the guideline set forth in the act.

This act is a precursor to the Electronic Signatures in Global and National Commerce Act (ESIGN) in 2000.

== Breakdown of the law ==
The text of the UETA is available on the Uniform Law Commission website.

Section 2: Definitions
(7) Electronic record - means a record created, generated, sent, communicated, received, or stored by electronic means.

(8) Electronic signature - means an electronic sound, symbol, or process attached to or logically associated with a record and executed or adopted by a person with the intent to sign the record.

Another important aspect of this definition lies in the necessity that the electronic signature be linked or logically associated with the record. In the paper world, it is assumed that the symbol adopted by a party is attached to or located somewhere in the same paper that is intended to be authenticated, e.g., an allonge firmly attached to a promissory note, or the classic signature at the end of a long contract. These tangible manifestations do not exist in the electronic environment, and accordingly, this definition expressly provides that the symbol must in some way be linked to, or connected with, the electronic record being signed. This linkage is consistent with the regulations promulgated by the Food and Drug Administration. 21 CFR Part 11 (March 20, 1997).

Section 3: Scope
The Scope of this Act is inherently limited by the fact that it only applies to transactions related to business, commercial (including consumer) and governmental matters. Consequently, transactions with no relation to business, commercial or governmental transactions would not be subject to this Act. Unilaterally generated electronic records and signatures which are not part of a transaction also are not covered by this Act.

Section 4: Application "...applies to any electronic record or electronic signature created, generated, sent, communicated, received, or stored"

Section 5(a): states that transactions are not required to be in electronic form
Section 5(b):
(b) This [Act] applies only to transactions between parties each of which has agreed to conduct transactions by electronic means. Whether the parties agree to conduct a transaction by electronic means is determined from the context and surrounding circumstances, including the parties' conduct.

Section 6: The application and intended purpose of the Act is listed, which is intended, "to facilitate and promote commerce and governmental transactions by validating and authorizing the use of electronic records and electronic signatures"

Section 7: Legal recognition of electronic signatures, records, and contracts
(a) A record or signature may not be denied legal effect or enforceability solely because it is in electronic form.
(b) A contract may not be denied legal effect or enforceability solely because an electronic record was used in its formation.
(c) If a law requires a record to be in writing, an electronic record satisfies the law.
(d) If a law requires a signature, an electronic signature satisfies the law.

Section 8: Provides that the information be available to all parties.
(a) ...An electronic record is not capable of retention by the recipient if the sender or its information processing system inhibits the ability of the recipient to print or store the electronic record.
(c) If a sender inhibits the ability of a recipient to store or print an electronic record, the electronic record is not enforceable against the recipient.

Section 9: Attribution and effect of an electronic record and electronic signatures
(a) An electronic record or electronic signature is attributable to a person if it was the act of the person. The act of the person may be shown in any manner, including a showing of the efficacy of any security procedure applied to determine the person to which the electronic record or electronic signature was attributable.
(b) The effect of an electronic record or electronic signature attributed to a person under subsection (a) is determined from the context and surrounding circumstances at the time of its creation, execution, or adoption, including the parties' agreement, if any, and otherwise as provided by law.

Section 10: Errors and changes

Section 11: Permits a notary public and other authorized officers to act electronically, effectively removing the stamp/seal requirements.

Section 12: The requirement of "retention of records" is satisfied by retaining an electronic record
(a) If a law requires that a record be retained, the requirement is satisfied by retaining an electronic record of the information in the record which:

(1) accurately reflects the information set forth in the record after it was first generated in its final form as an electronic record or otherwise; and
(2) remains accessible for later reference.

(c) A person may satisfy subsection (a) by using the services of another person if the requirements of that subsection are satisfied.

Section 13: Admissibility

Section 14: Automated transactions
(1) discussed situations where "...contract may be formed by the interaction of electronic agents of the parties, even if no individual was aware of or reviewed the electronic agents' actions or the resulting terms and agreements."
(2) applies to a contract that "may be formed by the interaction of an electronic agent and an individual".

Section 15: Defines the "Time and Place" aspects of electronic transmissions.
Comment 1. This section provides default rules regarding when and from where an electronic record is sent and when and where an electronic record is received. This section does not address the efficacy of the record that is sent or received. That is, whether a record is unintelligible or unusable by a recipient is a separate issue from whether that record was sent or received. The effectiveness of an illegible record, whether it binds any party, are questions left to other law.

Section 16 outlines transferable records
(c) A system satisfies subsection (b), and a person is deemed to have control of a transferable record, if the transferable record is created, stored, and assigned in such a manner that:

(1) a single authoritative copy of the transferable record exists which is unique, identifiable, and, except as otherwise provided in paragraphs (4), (5), and (6), unalterable;

Section 17-19 have been bracketed as optional provisions to be considered for adoption by each State.

== See also ==
- Electronic Signatures in Global and National Commerce Act (ESIGN)
- eIDAS
