= Biotechnology Society of Nepal =

- Established: 2007
- Type: Non-profit organization
- Location: Kathmandu, Nepal
- Key people: Nabin N. Munakarmi (President); Dr. Hari K. Shrestha (Vice President); Raja Ram Gurung (Secretary); Somila Kakshyapati (Treasurer); Prashanna Maharjan (Executive Member); Gaurav C. Gyawali (Executive Member); Santosh Dahal (Executive Member)
- Website: www.bsn.org.np

Biotechnology Society of Nepal (BSN) (Nepali: जैविक प्रविधि संस्था नेपाल) is an apolitical, non-government, non-profit organization motivated for promotion of Biotechnology in Nepal and beyond.

== Objectives ==
- To introduce, promote and propagate the use of biotechnology by encouraging basic and applied research and disseminating their results for sustainable development of the populace.
- To garner, compile and disseminate the information related to biotechnology in Nepal.
- To publish books, journals, memoirs and reports based on biotechnology
- To bring collaboration and cooperation between scientific societies and academic institutions of the country with international societies for promotion of interaction among research workers within and outside the country.
- To procure and manage funds and grants for the promotion of research and development of biotechnology.
- To study on physical and biological resources in Nepal and to develop suitable technological adroitness for their extraction and utilization.
- To develop a platform for integration of all students, research workers, scientists, academicians, entrepreneurs, policy makers, university biology teaching faculties and others interested in biotechnology for overall development of the country.

== Publications ==
Biotechnology Society of Nepal publishes the Nepal Journal of Biotechnology as a scientific journal.

== Founders ==
Mr. Saroj Ghimire, President (2007 to 2014)

== Executive Board members ==
- Mr. Nabin Narayan Munkarmi, President
- Mr. Kushal Shrestha, Vice President
- Mr. Dinesh Giri, Secretary
- Ms. Nisha Kiran Shrestha, Treasurer
- Mr. Binayak Raj Pandey, Executive Member
- Ms. Samikshya Kandel, Executive Member
- Mr. Puskar Thapa, Executive

Member[2]
