= Johann Hermann Baas =

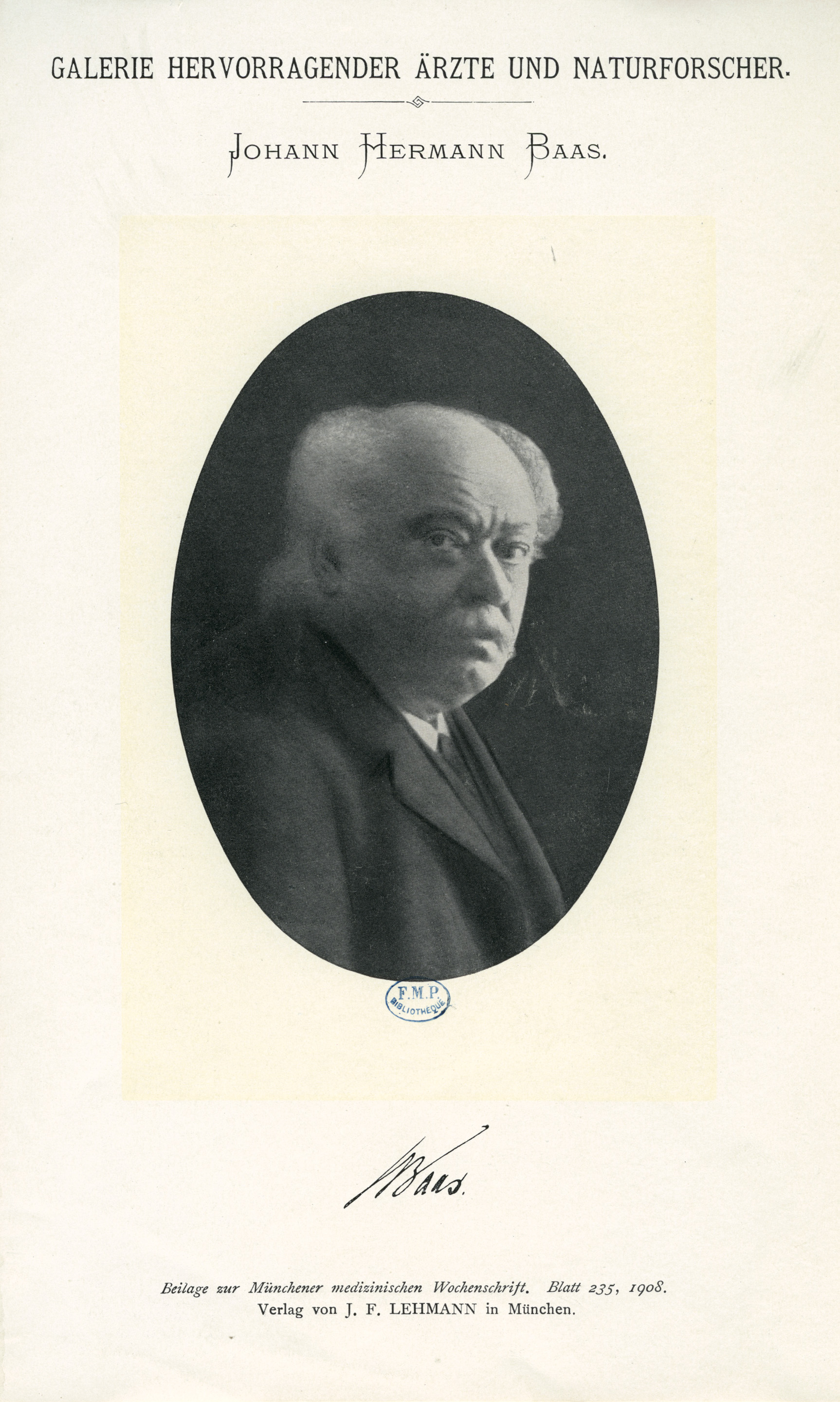
Johann Hermann Baas

Johann Hermann Baas [ba:s] (24 October 1838 – 10 November 1909) was a German physician best known for his writings on medical history.

Baas was born in Bechtheim, in Rhenish Hesse, and studied medicine at the University of Giessen. He graduated in 1860, and practiced medicine and ophthalmology in various towns of Rhenish Hesse. He undertook research into a number of areas of medicine, including hearing, but became best known for his influential histories of medicine. He died in Worms in 1909.

== Literary works ==
- Grundriss der Geschichte der Medizin und des heilenden Standes, 1876
- Die geschichtliche Entwicklung des ärztlichen Stands und der medizinischen Wissenschaften, 1896
