= Center for Service Support =

U.S. Navy training course headquarters

Coordinates: 41.512417°N 71.329436°W

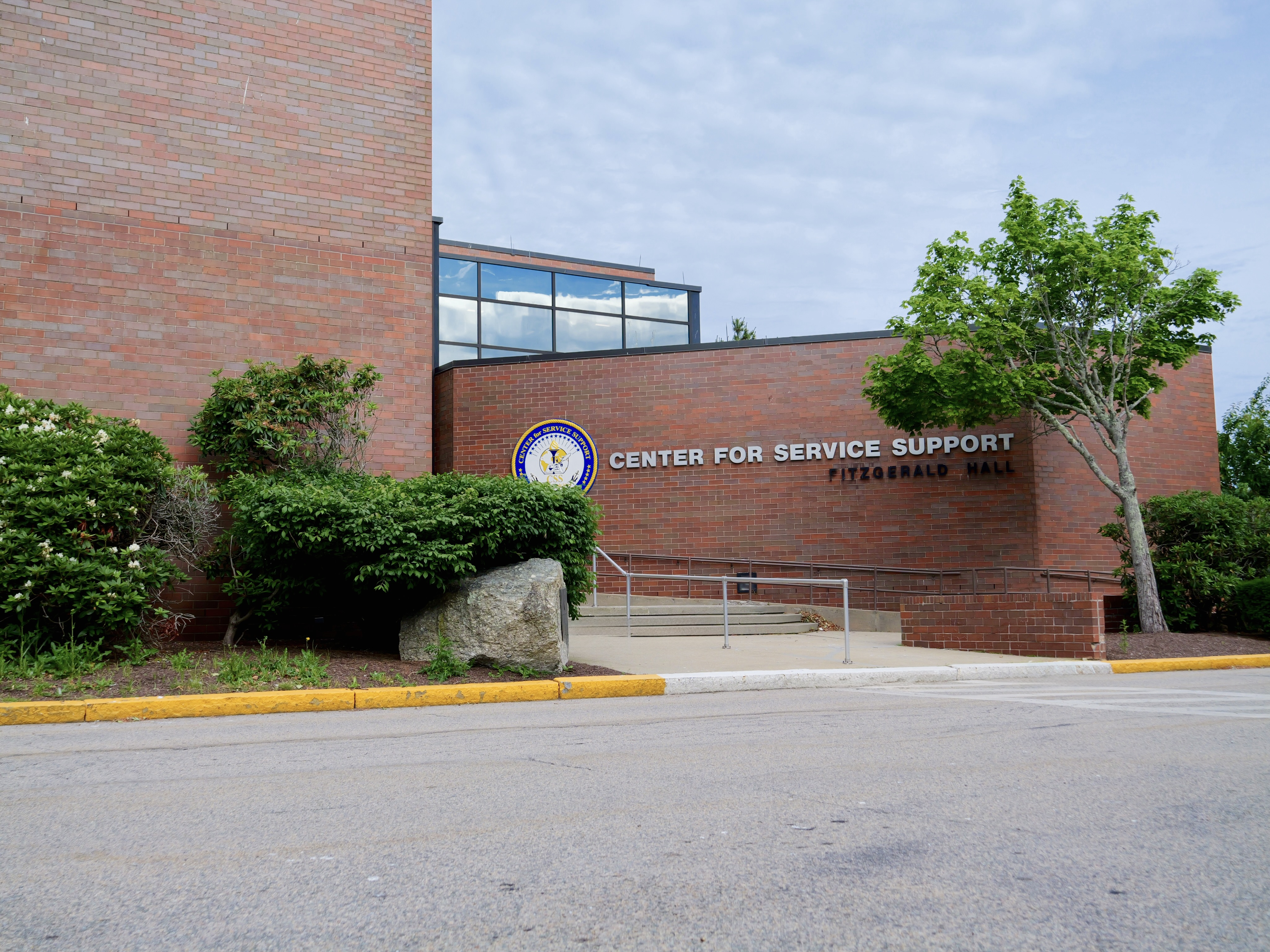
- Motto: Demand the Best!
- Type: U.S. Naval education and training
- Established: 1 February 2003; 23 years ago
- Commanding Officer: Capt. Dana J. Chapin
- Total staff: 400
- Students: 51,000 yearly
- Location: Newport, Rhode Island, United States
- Mission: To develop and deliver the highest-quality service support training to achieve Fleet readiness and warfighting advantage.
- Website: www.netc.navy.mil/CSS/
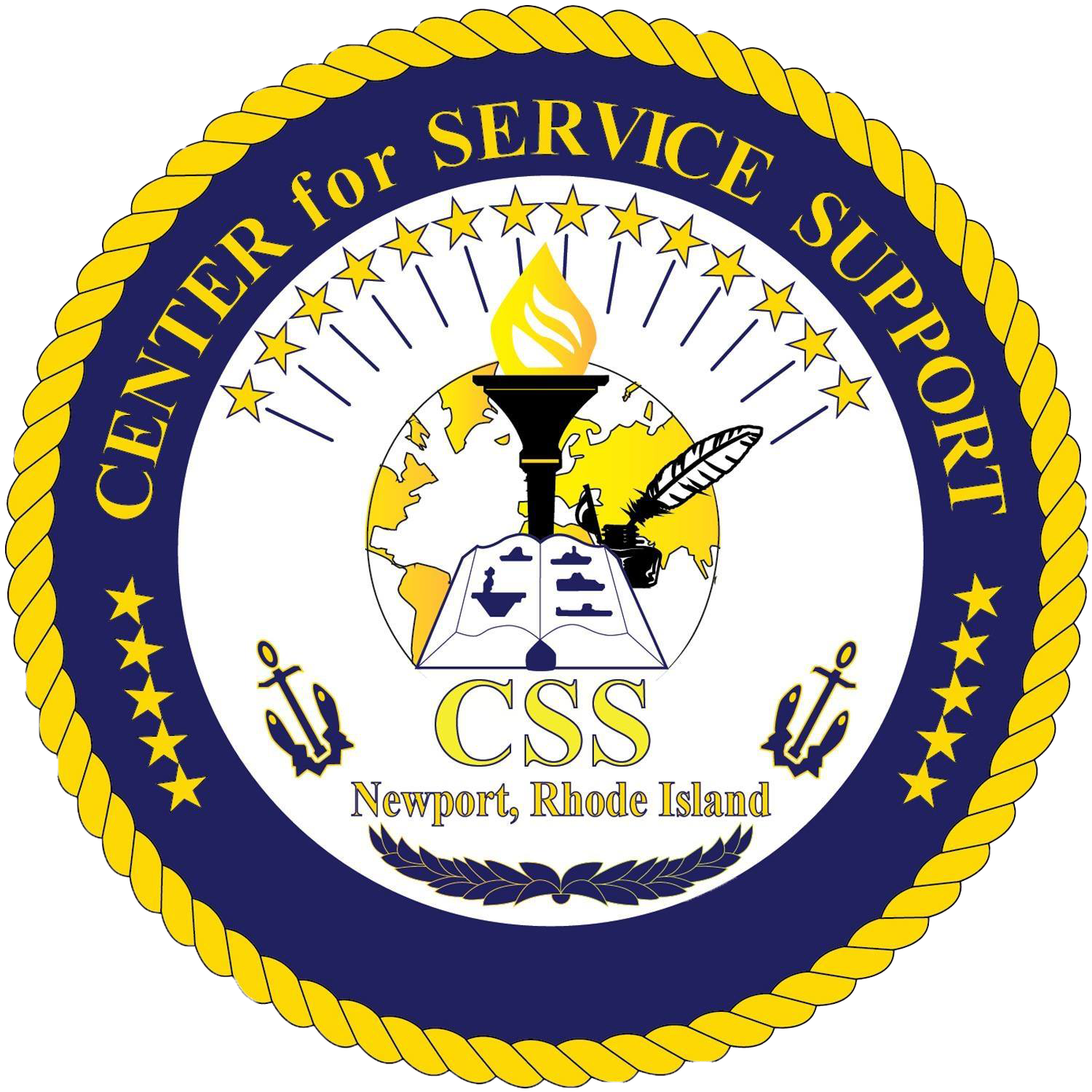

The Center for Service Support (CSS), located in Newport, Rhode Island, boasts a staff of more than 400 professional instructors and educators globally. It provides Sailors in the Naval administration, chaplaincy, command Support program management, human resources, logistics, maintenance coordination, media, and security management communities with the vital professional skills, knowledge, and education to support the Fleet’s warfighting mission. CSS also develops and delivers General Skills Training (GST) that builds personal and professional growth and development. The CSS is accredited by the Commission of the Council on Occupational Education (COE), which is a non-profit, volunteer membership, and nationally recognized accrediting agency.

The commanding officer currently is Captain Dana J. Chapin, the Executive Officer is Commander Matthew Sanchez and the Command Master Chief is CMDCM Richard Alvarado.

== History ==
CSS was established in Feb. 7, 2003, as part of the Naval Education and Training Command’s (NETC) “Revolution in Training” initiative, an effort to modernize and streamline how the U.S. Navy delivers training to the Fleet.

As part of the transformation, NETC established specialized learning centers focused on specific mission areas. Each learning center served as the link between Fleet training requirements, curriculum development, resource planning, and the instruction delivered in Navy schoolhouses.

CSS was assigned the responsibility for training across the Navy's logistics, administrative, and media communities. Initially, the command oversaw 14 learning sites, including the Navy Supply Corps School (NSCS), Naval Technical Training Center Meridian, Mississippi, and the Culinary Specialist (CS) School.

CSS was originally headquartered in Athens, Georgia, supported a geographically divers enterprise spanning the continental United States and Hawaii, providing training for 16 enlisted ratings and 12 officer designators.

During its early years, CSS led five Base Realignment and Closure (BRAC) actions, including the relocation of CSS headquarters and NSCS to their current locations in Newport, Rhode Island. Also included was the CS School move from Great Lakes, Illinois, to Fort Lee, Virginia. Further mission realignments, base closures, and rating mergers resulted in a leaner organization with seven highly specialized and diverse learning sites.

In July 2018, CSS expanded its mission when NETC transferred the General Skills Training (GST) mission and 11 GST learning sites to the command. This broadened CSS's role in developing education and training that builds personal, professional, and instructor knowledge and skills to support fleet readiness. The transfer also included oversight of the LifeSkills curriculum and the Navy General Military Training (GMT) content delivered through MyNavy Portal and Navy eLearning. A little later, in October 2018, the Deputy Undersecretary of the Navy reassigned the Security Education, Training and Awareness (SETA) Naval Security Manager Course (NSMC) and two additional SETA learning sites to CSS to develop military officers and civilians to serve as managers for command security programs.

In March 2019, the GST and advanced Administration and Logistics training missions were grouped into a single subordinate command - the Navy Service Support Advanced Training Command (NSSATC).

Today, CSS is a key member of the Navy Total Force Enterprise and reports directly to NETC while still working closely with stakeholders throughout the Navy. The command serves as the bridge between Fleet requirements and classroom instruction, ensuring that changes in policy and operational requirements are incorporated into up-to-date training. By nurturing and maintaining strong partnerships, CSS ensures that all Sailors receive the knowledge and skills they need to support the Fleet and mission readiness wherever they serve.

== Who the Center for Service Support trains ==
- Culinary Specialist (CS)
- Legalman (LN)
- Logistics Specialist (LS)
- Mass Communication Specialist (MC)
- Musician (MU)
- Navy Counselor (NC)
- Personnel Specialist (PS)
- Religious Program Specialist (RP)
- Retail Services Specialist (RS)
- Yeoman (YN)
- Chaplain Corps (1945, 4105, 4100)
- Supply Corps (310X, 651X, 751X)

Also: U.S. Marine Corps, government civilians, and international partners.

CSS also houses the Human Resources Center of Excellence (HRCOE). The current commanding officer of HRCOE is Capt. Jeffrey Morin.

== Locations ==
- Naval Chaplaincy School, Newport, Rhode Island
- Naval School of Music, Virginia Beach, Virginia
- Navy Supply Corps School, Newport, Rhode Island
- Navy Service Support Advanced Training Command (NSSATC), Dam Neck, Virginia
- Naval Technical Training Center Meridian, Meridian, Mississippi
