= Context-sensitive solutions =

Context-sensitive solutions (CSS) is a theoretical and practical approach to transportation decision-making and design that takes into consideration the communities and lands through which streets, roads, and highways pass ("the context"). The term is closely related to but distinguishable from context-sensitive design in that it asserts that all decisions in transportation planning, project development, operations, and maintenance should be responsive to the context in which these activities occur, not simply the design process. CSS seeks to balance the need to move vehicles efficiently and safely with other desirable outcomes, including historic preservation, environmental sustainability, and the creation of vital public spaces. In transit projects, CSS generally refers to context sensitive planning, design, and development around transit stations, also known as transit-oriented development.

== Overview ==
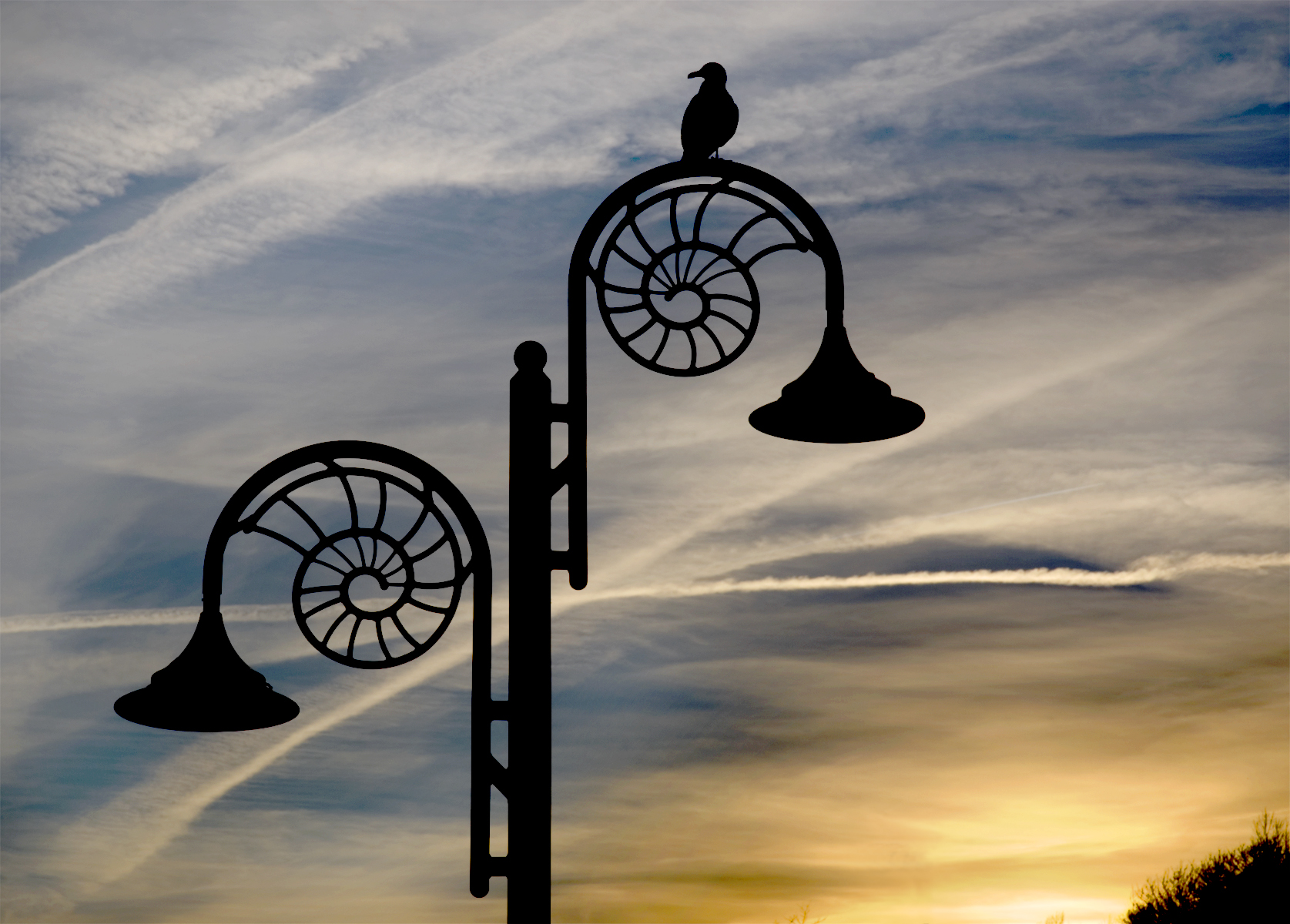
Custom-designed fittings are one aspect of CSS. Here, the ammonite design of the lamp standards reflects the local geology of Lyme Regis.

In contrast to long-standing practices in transportation design that place primary importance on moving traffic (vehicular throughput), the CSS process emphasizes that transportation facilities should fit their physical settings and preserve scenic, aesthetic, historic and environmental resources, while maintaining safety and mobility. For instance, if a state highway passes through a downtown main street, applying CSS principles would entail creating a street where the movement of vehicles does not impede pedestrian activity and sidewalk commerce, rather than a street that is simply widened and straightened to increase speed, capacity and mobility for vehicles as a singular transportation objective. CSS therefore includes principles for context-sensitive decision-making that place a high value on community input and consensus, and more technical principles of context sensitive design.

When CSS principles are applied to transportation projects, the process involves a much broader range of disciplines than traditional transportation design methods, which rely exclusively on the judgment of traffic engineers. CSS is a collaborative, interdisciplinary approach that involves everyone with a significant stake in the project, such as the residents, businesses and local institutions that will be affected by an intervention or a failure to address the transportation implications of development such as congestion. Rather than approaching these stakeholders at the tail end of the design process in an attempt to gain approval, CSS emphasizes the need to incorporate their feedback from the very outset of the planning and design development processes and during all subsequent stages of construction, operations and maintenance.

== Qualities of a CSS project ==
The following list of qualities (developed at a 1998 conference for transportation planners called "Thinking Beyond the Pavement") describes the core goals of the CSS process.

The CSS Product: Qualities of Excellence in Transportation Design

The "Qualities that Characterize Excellence in Transportation Design" – that is, of the physical end product of the CSS process – are:

- The project satisfies the purpose and needs as agreed to by a full range of stakeholders.
- This agreement is forged in the earliest phase of the project and amended as warranted as the project develops.
- The project is a safe facility for both the user and the community.
- The project is in harmony with the community, and it preserves environmental, scenic, aesthetic, historic, and natural resource values of the area, i.e., exhibits context sensitive design.
- The project exceeds the expectations of both designers and stakeholders and achieves a level of excellence in people's minds.
- The project involves efficient and effective use of the resources (time, budget, community) of all involved parties.
- The project is designed and built with minimal disruption to the community.
- The project is seen as having added lasting value to the community.

— As agreed upon by participants of the Thinking Beyond the Pavement Conference, 1998

== The CSS process ==
This outline of the core steps in the CSS process was also developed at the "Thinking Beyond the Pavement" conference.

The CSS Process: Characteristics of the Process That Yield Excellence

"The Characteristics of the Process that will Yield Excellence in Transportation Design" are:

- Communication with all stakeholders is open, honest, early, and continuous.
- A multidisciplinary team is established early, with disciplines based on the needs of the specific project, and with the inclusion of the public.
- A full range of stakeholders is involved with transportation officials in the scoping phase (the period before design is begun when the scope of the project is agreed upon). The purposes of the project are clearly defined, and consensus on the scope is forged before proceeding.
- The highway development process is tailored to meet the circumstances. This process should examine multiple alternatives that will result in a consensus of approach methods.
- A commitment to the process from top agency officials and local leaders is secured.
- The public involvement process, which includes informal meetings, is tailored to the project.
- The landscape, the community, and valued resources are understood before engineering design is started. A full range of tools for communication about project alternatives is used (e.g., visualization).

— As agreed upon by participants of the Thinking Beyond the Pavement Conference, 1998

== History ==
The initial guiding principles of CSS came out of the 1998 "Thinking Beyond the Pavement" conference as a means to describe and foster transportation projects that preserve and enhance the natural and built environments along with economic and social assets for neighborhoods they pass through. In 2003, the Federal Highway Administration announced that under one of its three Vital Few Objectives (Environmental Stewardship and Streamlining) they had a target goal of achieving CSS integration within all state Departments of Transportation by September 2007.

The American Association of State Highway and Transportation Organizations (AASHTO) is now (fall 2006) developing strategic goals and objectives for CSS which it describes as a "fundamental change in the way we do business." One principal element of this change is the way transportation planners and engineers address speed. Historically, the speed at which a vehicle can safely travel through the landscape has been regarded as a primary goal of transportation planning since it shortens travel time, saves money (time is money), and improves driver convenience. However, CSS recognizes that designing a facility for the maximum safe speed that is economically feasible can be detrimental to other community goals, and even to vehicle passengers themselves. CSS recognizes that the goal of transportation is social and economic exchange, which cannot occur at high speeds. Instead, CSS attempts to identify, through a community-based process, a "target speed" that promotes the optimum amount of social and economic exchange, with lowest environmental impacts, that is appropriate for the context. Thus, in cities, if higher vehicle speeds lower the amount of social exchange on a residential street (fewer friends, less street life etc.) then the street will be designed to encourage drivers to slow down so as not to reduce social exchange. In a similar manner, commercial streets will be designed to maximize commercial exchange and designed accordingly. In more rural areas where a primary goal is to move people and goods between human settlements, CSS can be compatible with much higher design speeds. Setting a target speed that is appropriate for the context, and then designing roads, highways and streets to make it difficult for drivers to exceed that target speed, is a central CSS principle and represents a fundamental shift in transportation planning practice.

== See also ==
- Transportation planning
- Complete streets
- Placemaking
- New Urbanism
- Transit-oriented development
- Town meeting
