= Single Digital Gateway =

The single digital gateway is an EU-wide government information platform for citizens and businesses. It consists of one central EU website in all official languages of the EU (Your Europe) and a network of national and municipal portals in all EU and EFTA countries in the national language and at least one other commonly understood language.

Your Europe exists since 2006. In 2018 the European Parliament and the Council adopted a single digital gateway regulation giving the network a legal basis.

To make sure procedures can be completed online, and that citizens and businesses can submit the necessary official documents and data according to the “once-only” principle, EU and national authorities created a technical infrastructure to which authorities can connect.

== Content ==
It offers online access to official EU, national and municipal

- information about rights and obligations,
- administrative procedures, and
- assistance services.

Users can also report issues they had with a public administration in an EU country.

== Target audience ==
The single digital gateway is meant for EU citizens and businesses who live, work, study, travel or do business in another EU country.

== Logo ==
National and municipal websites participating in the gateway can be easily recognised by the Your Europe logo.
