= Electronic Signatures in Global and National Commerce Act =

United States federal law

- Long title: An Act To facilitate the use of electronic records and signatures in interstate or foreign commerce

Citations
- Public law: Pub. L. 106–229 (text) (PDF)
- Statutes at Large: 114 Stat. 464

The Electronic Signatures in Global and National Commerce Act (ESIGN Act, (Note: Abbreviated also as E-Sign Act.) Pub. L. 106–229 (text) (PDF), 114 Stat. 464, enacted June 30, 2000, 15 U.S.C. ch. 96) is a United States federal law, passed by the U.S. Congress to facilitate the use of electronic records and electronic signatures in interstate and foreign commerce. This is done by ensuring the validity and legal effect of contracts entered into electronically; the Act was signed into law by President Bill Clinton on June 30, 2000, and took effect on October 1, 2000.

Although every state has at least one law pertaining to electronic signatures, it is the federal law that lays out the guidelines for interstate commerce. The general intent of the ESIGN Act is spelled out in the first section (101.a), that a contract or signature "may not be denied legal effect, validity, or enforceability solely because it is in electronic form". This simple statement provides that electronic signatures and records are just as good as their paper equivalents, and therefore subject to the same legal scrutiny of authenticity that applies to paper documents.

== Contents ==
=== Definitions ===
Section 106 of the ESIGN Act defines:

- (2) ELECTRONIC – The term 'electronic' means relating to technology having electrical, digital, magnetic, wireless, optical, electromagnetic, or similar capabilities.
- ...
- (4) ELECTRONIC RECORD – The term 'electronic record' means a contract or other record created, generated, sent, communicated, received, or stored by electronic means.
- (5) ELECTRONIC SIGNATURE – The term 'electronic signature' means an electronic sound, symbol, or process, attached to or logically associated with a contract or other record and executed or adopted by a person with the intent to sign the record.

=== General intent ===
- (1) a signature, contract, or other record relating to such transaction may not be denied legal effect, validity, or enforceability solely because it is in electronic form; and
- (2) a contract relating to such transaction may not be denied legal effect, validity, or enforceability solely because an electronic signature or electronic record was used in its formation.

=== Consumer disclosure ===
Section 101 of the ESIGN Act, sub-section (b), preserves the rights of individuals to choose not to electronic signatures. Here the law provides that individuals reserve the right to use a paper signature. Sub-section (c) is in direct support of (b) by requiring a "Consumer Disclosure" that the signatory has consented to use an electronic format.

Section 101(c)(1)(C) states that the consumer also "consents electronically, in a manner that reasonably demonstrates that the consumer can access information in the electronic form that will be used to provide the information that is the subject of the consent".

The consumer must provide affirmative consent, meaning that it cannot be assumed that a consumer has given consent simply because he/she has not chosen the option to deny consent, or has not responded to an option to grant consent.

The first public implementation of Section 106 of the ESIGN Act came nine months prior to its approval, when in October 1999, SaveDaily.com founder Eric Solis, used an electronic signature to establish paperless brokerage accounts. Solis overcame the requirements of section 101(c)(1)(C) by causing the consumer to agree in advance via Consumer Disclosures that all communications, including signatures would be executed and delivered electronically.

=== Retention of contracts and records ===
Section 101(d) provides that if a law requires that a business retain a record of a transaction, the business satisfies the requirement by retaining an electronic record, as long as the record 1) "accurately reflects" the substance of the original record in an unalterable format, 2) is "accessible" to people who are entitled to access it, 3) is "in a form that is capable of being accurately reproduced for later reference, whether by transmission, printing or otherwise", and 4) is retained for the legally required period of time.

=== Promotion of international electronic commerce ===
Title III (section 301) directs the Secretary of Commerce to promote the use of electronic signatures on an international basis, taking "all actions necessary" to remove or reduce barriers which could obstruct the wider adoption of electronic commerce.

== See also ==
- Title 21 CFR Part 11
- Uniform Electronic Transactions Act
- eIDAS
- China RealDID
