= Electronic Signatures Directive =

EU directive

Directive 1999/93/EC
- European Union directive
- Title: Directive 1999/93/EC of the European Parliament and of the Council of 13 December 1999 on a Community framework for electronic signatures
- Made by: European Parliament & Council
- Journal reference: [31999L0093 L13, pp. 12–20]

Other legislation
- Replaced by: Regulation 910/2014 (eIDAS) from 1 July 2016.

The Electronic Signatures Directive 1999/93/EC was a European Union directive on the use of electronic signatures (e-signatures) in electronic contracts within the European Union (EU).

It was repealed by the eIDAS regulation on 1 July 2016.

== Contents ==
The central provision of the directive is article 5, which requires that electronic signatures are regarded as equivalent to written signatures.

Legal effects of electronic signatures

1. Member States shall ensure that advanced electronic signatures which are based on a qualified certificate and which are created by a secure-signature-creation device:

(a) satisfy the legal requirements of a signature in relation to data in electronic form in the same manner as a handwritten signature satisfies those requirements in relation to paper-based data; and
(b) are admissible as evidence in legal proceedings.

== Related acts ==
- Communication from the Commission to the Council, the European Parliament, the European Economic and Social Committee and the Committee of the Regions - Action Plan on e-signatures and e-identification to facilitate the provision of cross-border public services in the Single Market
  COM(2008) 798 final – Not published in the Official Journal
- Report from the Commission to the European Parliament and the Council - Report on the operation of Directive 1999/93/EC on a Community framework for electronic signatures
  COM(2006) 120 final – Not published in the Official Journal
- 2003/511/EC: Commission Decision of 14 July 2003 on the publication of reference numbers of generally recognised standards for electronic signature products in accordance with Directive 1999/93/EC of the European Parliament and of the Council
  Official Journal L 175, 15/07/2003 P. 0045 - 0046
- 2000/709/EC: Commission Decision of 6 November 2000 on the minimum criteria to be taken into account by Member States when designating bodies in accordance with Article 3(4) of Directive 1999/93/EC of the European Parliament and of the Council on a Community framework for electronic signatures
  Official Journal L 289, 16/11/2000 P. 0042 - 0043

== See also ==
- Digital signatures and law § European Union and the European Economic Area
- Electronic signature
- United States Electronic Signatures in Global and National Commerce Act
