= Blockchain as a service =

Blockchain as a service (BaaS) is an enterprise-level software service that allows businesses to use cloud-based integration solutions to build, host and use their own blockchain apps, smart contracts and functions on the blockchain infrastructure developed by a vendor. Just like the growing trend of using software as a service (SaaS) where access to the software is provided on a subscription basis, BaaS provides a business with access to a blockchain network of its desired configuration without the business having to develop their own blockchain and build in-house expertise on the subject.

Currently major blockchain-as-a-service providers are major cloud services providers and consulting firms, including:

- cloud services providers: IBM, SalesForce, Microsoft, Amazon, Alibaba, Oracle and Baidu to name a few, as well we major consulting firms；
- consulting service providers: Deloitte, McKinsey, EY.
