= Digital Signature Services =

Digital Signature Services (DSS) is an OASIS standard.

As part of a Technical Committee (TC), specialising in “signature services”, a “Core” specification was created by the international standardization organization OASIS in 2007. This standard defines the basic functionality for the creation (SignRequest /-Response) and validation (VerifyRequest /-Response) of CMS- and XMLDSig-compliant signatures. Due to the wide range of requirements from the various application areas of signatures and time-stamps, the core specification has been extended by a series of so-called “profiles”, e.g. for use with code signing, entity seals or processing XAdES- and CAdES-compliant artifacts. In the following years further profiles were developed, e.g. for detailed signature verification reports and for signature creation devices not located within the server instance.

Based on this previous work, the challenges of a new “API-Ecosystem” were addressed in the OASIS Digital Signature Services eXtended (DSS-X) TC with version 2.0 of the Core, which also separates the semantics of the interface from the concrete implementation using a specific syntax. In addition to the XML syntax adopted from version 1, JSON, which is often used in modern web applications, is now also supported. Additional syntaxes could be defined, if required. For example, an ASN.1 based syntax would be conceivable to enable a particularly compact format for mobile and embedded applications with the “Packed Encoding Rules” (PER). To ensure the highest possible visibility and acceptance of the standard, the DSS-X Technical Committee, in collaboration with the OASIS Infrastructure team, has started to provide the interface on the „SwaggerHub“ collaboration platform. For this purpose, the JSON schema is extended by a series of meta-information to comply with the OpenAPI specification.

The profiles, recently created by ETSI and currently at OASIS, enable the specific characteristics of the AdES signature formats in combination with local and remote eIDAS-compliant signature created devices via the DSS-X interface. The additional attributes of the signatures (e.g., the embedded certificate status information, time-stamps or evidence records) allow a wide applicability of this format. Since the initial standardisation, the associated interface extensions for the XAdES and CAdES formats are defined by the “AdES-Profile”. As part of version 2.0, the AdES-Profile is currently updated to support the latest developments related to the AdES formats. In particular, the PAdES format based on the PDF specification is also supported in accordance with ETSI EN 319 142-1. With this PAdES format multiple signatures in a workflow and the visual representation of an electronic signature in a PDF document can be realised.

For use within the eIDAS environment, the support of so-called “policies” by the DSS-X specification proves to be valuable. This allows the caller to submit a “policy” to the service, required for the desired action. The addressed server instance decides whether it can meet the required quality level or whether the request must be rejected. If the request is processed, the applied “policy” can be transferred to the caller within the response structure. This ensures that a consensus has been reached on the minimum quality level to be applied.

== See also ==
- OASIS
- XML Signature
- XAdES
