= Khmer Bird =

Cambodian blog

KhmerBird is a blog created by Santel Phin, a Cambodian writer, in 2008. The blog is focused on news and events in Cambodia, and more recently, on Cambodia's online business community.

KhmerBird is one of the top five blogs in Cambodia according to the Phnom Penh Post.
