= ECML (disambiguation) =

The East Coast Main Line (ECML) is a major railway line in the United Kingdom.

ECML may also refer to:

- Electronic Commerce Modeling Language
- ECML PKDD, the European Conference on Machine Learning

== See also ==
- WCML (disambiguation)
  - West Coast Main Line
