= MLEC =

MLEC may refer to:

- Meriwether Lewis Electric Cooperative, a rural utility cooperative in Tennessee
- Miami Lakes Educational Center
- Movement for the Liberation of the Enclave of Cabinda
- Model Law on Electronic Commerce

== See also ==
- MLES
