= Internet company =

Internet company may refer to:

- Internet service provider, a company whose main activity is providing Internet access to customers
- Dot-com company, a company which does most of its business on the Internet.
- Electronic business, a.k.a. online business, any kind of business relies on sharing information via the internet
  - E-commerce company, online businesses which mediate internet commerce
