= Paperless loan =

A paperless loan is a loan that is arranged solely online or over the phone without the borrower having to complete paper forms or signing them physically. Documents may still be required to approve the loan but these are submitted online using scanned or electronic copies. The advantages are that it reduces the time it takes to process a loan application, processes can be automated, and decisions can be made faster.

A paperless loan procedure makes it easier for the lending institution to receive and verify loan applications before approving them. Potential borrowers may prefer the digital loan process as it avoids having to visit the lender's branch and filling out manual forms.

Paperless loans are normally offered where the borrowers circumstances are straight forward, i.e. salaried individuals with a good credit score and documents may not be required if the information can be verified electronically. They are also offered by payday lenders and online-only loan companies for smaller loans. The lenders may make the process very simple and instead of quoting interest rates will express the loan in terms of a fee that is paid when the loan is repaid, which may equate to very high interest rates.

Paperless loans developed in the 2010s as the internet and mobile access became easily available, lenders could use electronic verification of the borrower to make lending decisions, and electronic signature became available and was accepted in law.

== Criticism ==
Some people argue that paperless payday lenders target vulnerable people, such as low-income communities, emphasizing the ease of getting a loan regardless of the target audience being vulnerable and unfamiliar with the repaying process and charging high interest rates.
