= Government Paperwork Elimination Act =

1998 US federal law

The Government Paperwork Elimination Act (GPEA, Pub. L. 105–277 (text) (PDF) Title XVII) is a law of the United States of America that requires that, when practicable, federal agencies use electronic forms, electronic filing, and electronic signatures to conduct official business with the public by 2003. In doing this, agencies will create records with business, legal, and, in some cases, historical value. This guidance focuses on records management issues involving records that have been created using electronic signature technology.

The Act requires agencies, by October 21, 2003, to allow individuals or entities that deal with the agencies the option to submit information or transact with the agency electronically, when practicable, and to maintain records electronically, when practicable. The Act specifically states that electronic records and their related electronic signatures are not to be denied legal effect, validity, or enforceability merely because they are in electronic form, and encourages Federal government use of a range of electronic signature alternatives.

The Act seeks to "preclude agencies or courts from systematically treating electronic documents and signatures less favorably than their paper counterparts", so that citizens can interact with the Federal government electronically. It requires Federal agencies, by October 21, 2003, to provide individuals or entities that deal with agencies the option to submit information or transact with the agency electronically, and to maintain records electronically, when practicable. It also addresses the matter of private employers being able to use electronic means to store, and file with Federal agencies, information pertaining to their employees. GPEA states that electronic records and their related electronic signatures are not to be denied legal effect, validity, or enforceability merely because they are in electronic form. It also encourages Federal government use of a range of electronic signature alternatives.

The Act is technology-neutral, meaning that the act does not require the government to use one technology over another. This approach has both advantages and disadvantages. By remaining neutral it allows each government agency to decide which technology fits its specific needs. It also means that the government is not restricted to use an older technology as newer and better systems are made available. As a disadvantage, some may argue over which signature capturing method is best and such disagreements may slow the process of implementation.

== See also ==
- Electronic signature
- Digital signature
- Digital privacy
- Electronic Signatures in Global and National Commerce Act
- Office of Management and Budget
