= Lumin (company) =

- Type: Private
- Industry: Software
- Founded: 2014
- Founder: Max Ferguson
- Headquarters: Christchurch, New Zealand
- Key people: Max Ferguson (CEO)
- Products: Lumin PDF; Lumin Sign; AgreementGen
- Website: www.luminpdf.com

Lumin is a New Zealand-based software developer specialising in PDF editing, electronic signatures and document workflows. Founded in Christchurch in 2014 by Max Ferguson, it operates through Lumin Technology Limited. Its original product, Lumin PDF, a PDF editing application integrated with Google Drive.

== History ==
Lumin originated from a PDF editing application developed by Ferguson after studying civil engineering at the University of Canterbury and working on reconstruction projects following the 2011 Christchurch earthquake. He undertook doctoral studies at Stanford University while continuing to develop the software.

In November 2021, Radio New Zealand reported that Lumin had 60 million users worldwide, including 20 million who had registered during that year.

By 2022, Lumin had approximately 75 million registered users and had expanded into electronic-signature software. That year, Ferguson received the Young Entrepreneur category award in the New Zealand EY Entrepreneur of the Year programme.

In January 2025, Radio New Zealand reported that Lumin had reached 100 million registered users. Its software offerings had expanded beyond PDF editing to include electronic signatures and artificial intelligence features. Ferguson stated that Lumin was profitable and had not received venture capital funding. The Otago Daily Times also reported that revenue from the software had been reinvested into its development.

== Products ==
Lumin's software includes Lumin PDF, a PDF viewing, annotation and editing application, and Lumin Sign, an electronic-signature tool.
