= Advanced electronic signature =

EU-compliant electronic signature system

An advanced electronic signature (AES or AdES) is an electronic signature that has met the requirements set forth under EU Regulation No 910/2014 (eIDAS-regulation) on electronic identification and trust services for electronic transactions in the European Single Market.

== Description ==
eIDAS created standards for the use of electronic signatures so that they could be used securely when conducting business online, such as an electronic fund transfer or official business across borders with EU Member States. The advanced electronic signature is one of the standards outlined in eIDAS.

For an electronic signature to be considered as advanced it must meet several requirements:

1. The signatory can be uniquely identified and linked to the signature
2. The signatory must have sole control of the signature creation data (typically a private key) that was used to create the electronic signature
3. The signature must be capable of identifying if its accompanying data has been tampered with after the message was signed
4. In the event that the accompanying data has been changed, the signature must be invalidated

Advanced electronic signatures that are compliant with eIDAS may be technically implemented through the Ades Baseline Profiles that have been developed by the European Telecommunications Standards Institute (ETSI):

- XAdES, XML Advanced Electronic Signatures is a set of extensions to XML-DSig recommendation making it suitable for Advanced Electronic Signatures.
- PAdES, PDF Advanced Electronic Signatures is a set of restrictions and extensions to PDF and ISO 32000-1 making it suitable for Advanced Electronic Signatures.
- CAdES, CMS Advanced Electronic Signatures is a set of extensions to Cryptographic Message Syntax (CMS) signed data, making it suitable for Advanced Electronic Signatures.
- JAdES, JSON Advanced Electronic Signatures is a set of extensions to JSON Web Signature (RFC 7515) making it suitable for Advanced Electronic Signatures.
- ASiC Baseline Profile. ASiC (Associated Signature Containers) specifies the use of container structures to bind together one or more signed objects with either advanced electronic signatures or time-stamp tokens into one single digital (zip) container.

== Vision ==
The implementation of advanced electronic signatures under the specification of eIDAS serves several purposes. Business and public services processes, even those that go across borders can be safely expedited by using electronic signing. With eIDAS, EU States are required to establish "points of single contact" (PSCs) for trust services that ensure the electronic ID schemes can be used in public sector transactions that occur cross-borders, including access to healthcare information across borders.

In the past, when signing a document or message, the signatory would sign it and then return it to its intended recipient through the postal service, via facsimile service, or by scanning and attaching it to an email. This could lead to delays and, of course, the possibility that signatures could be forged and documents altered, especially when multiple signatures from different people located in different locations are required. The process of using an advanced electronic signature saves time, is legally binding and assures a high level of technical security.

== Legal implications ==
Following Article 25 (1) of the eIDAS regulation, an advanced electronic signature shall "not be denied legal effect and admissibility as evidence in legal proceedings". However it will reach a higher probative value when enhanced to the level of a qualified electronic signature. By adding a certificate that has been issued by a qualified trust service provider that attests to the authenticity of the qualified signature, the upgraded advanced signature then carries according to Article 24 (2) of the eIDAS Regulation the same legal value as a handwritten signature. However, this is only regulated in the European Union and similarly through ZertES in Switzerland. A qualified electronic signature is not defined in the United States.

== See also ==
- Trusted timestamping
- Qualified electronic signature
