= Armenian Distance Learning Network =

- Website type: Electronic learning, Distance education
- Owners: Adena Ltd, Armenia
- Creator: Albert Poghosyan
- Website: e-courses.am at the Wayback Machine (archived 2007-05-22)
- Commercial: Yes

Armenian Distance Learning Network (ADLN) was the first Armenian e-learning project. The project was launched in early 2002 and was restructured and updated in January, 2006. ADLN courses were business based and target Armenian speaking users of the Internet. The project was designed as a contribution to the development of Armenian beginner entrepreneurs who wish to be involved in the growth of e-business in Armenia as well as the country’s general e-growth. The web-page language was Armenian; the system was based on a course management system - Moodle. The website is no longer operational; the final archived version was captured March 2012.

== History ==
The e-project ADLN was the first step to develop an e-learning community in Armenia and form a positive attitude towards the phenomenon. First e-course implemented by ADLN was entitled “Electronic Commerce”. The course materials were based on the first e-commerce book in Armenian Language “E-commerce” (2004) written by Albert Poghosyan. Fifty participants from all over Armenia were involved in the course, which offered also after course consultation opportunities if the participants express a desire to develop their own e-projects. After the graduation, the participants received a certificate together with the upper mentioned book. The second e-course that attracted more than 150 participants was entitled “Electronic Marketing” (2006). ADLN had 60 graduates that completed the whole learning and assessment process. The third e-course entitled “PR in the new era of communication” was in the process of development. All courses were conducted only in Armenian, thus the course development and adaptation process was considered to be of high importance. The system was connected to the Armenian Electronic Payment System - EDram, as well as international on-line & credit card payment systems thus the users were able to register both – on-line and off-line. System tools of the ADLN system were:

1. Learning Content
2. Learner Content
3. Administrative Content
4. Assessment
5. Forum
6. Chat
7. Library
8. E-course additional resources
9. Calendar – individual scheduling
10. On-line support
11. Feedback
