= Detached signature =

A detached signature is a type of digital signature that is kept separate from its signed data, as opposed to bundled together into a single file.

This approach offers several advantages, such as preventing unauthorized modifications to the original data objects. However, there is a risk that the detached signature could become separated from its associated data, making the data inaccessible.

== See also ==
- XML Signature
