= Electronic business =

Business that takes place over the internet

Electronic business (also known as online business or e-business) is any kind of business or commercial activity that includes sharing information across the internet. Commerce constitutes the exchange of products and services between businesses, groups, and individuals; and can be seen as one of the essential activities of any business.

E-commerce focuses on the use of ICT to enable the external activities and relationships of the business with individuals, groups, and other organizations, while e-business does not only deal with online commercial operations of enterprises, but also deals with their other organizational matters such as human resource management and production. The term "e-business" was coined by IBM's marketing and Internet team in 1996.

== Market participants ==
Electronic business can take place between a very large number of market participants. It can be between business and consumer, private individuals, public administrations, or any other organizations such as non-governmental organizations (NGOs). These various market participants can be divided into three main groups:

1. Business (B)
2. Consumer (C)
3. Administration (A)

All of them can be either buyers or service providers within the market. There are nine possible combinations for electronic business relationships. B2C and B2B belong to E-commerce, while A2B and A2A belong to the E-government sector which is also a part of the electronic business.

== History ==
One of the founding pillars of electronic business was the development of the Electronic Data Interchange (EDI) electronic data interchange. This system replaced traditional mailing and faxing of documents with a digital transfer of data from one computer to another, without any human intervention. Michael Aldrich is considered the developer of the predecessor to online shopping. In 1979, the entrepreneur connected a television set to a transaction processing computer with a telephone line and called it "teleshopping", meaning shopping at distance. From the mid-nineties, major advancements were made in the commercial use of the Internet. Amazon, which launched in 1995, started as an online bookstore and grew to become nowadays the largest online retailer worldwide, selling food, toys, electronics, apparel and more. Other successful stories of online marketplaces include eBay or Etsy. In 1994, IBM, with its agency Ogilvy & Mather, began to use its foundation in IT solutions and expertise to market itself as a leader of conducting business on the Internet through the term "e-business." Then CEO Louis V. Gerstner, Jr. was prepared to invest $1 billion to market this new brand.

After conducting worldwide market research in October 1997, IBM began with an eight-page piece in The Wall Street Journal that would introduce the concept of "e-business" and advertise IBM's expertise in the new field. IBM decided not to trademark the term "e-business" in the hopes that other companies would use the term and create an entirely new industry. However, this proved to be too successful and by 2000, to differentiate itself, IBM launched a $300 million campaign about its "e-business infrastructure" capabilities. Since that time, the terms, "e-business" and "e-commerce" have been loosely interchangeable and have become a part of the common vernacular.

According to the U.S. Department Of Commerce, the estimated retail e-commerce sales in Q1 2020 were representing almost 12% of total U.S. retail sales, against 4% for Q1 2010.

== Business model ==
The transformation toward e-business is complex and in order for it to succeed, there is a need to balance between strategy, an adapted business model (e-intermediary, marketplaces), right processes (sales, marketing) and technology (Supply Chain Management, Customer Relationship Management). When organizations go online, they have to decide which e-business models best suit their goals. A business model is defined as the organization of product, service and information flows, and the source of revenues and benefits for suppliers and customers. The concept of the e-business model is the same but used in online presence.

=== Revenue model ===
A key component of the business model is the revenue model or profit model, which is a framework for generating revenues. It identifies which revenue source to pursue, what value to offer, how to price the value, and who pays for the value. It is a key component of a company's business model. It primarily identifies what product or service will be created in order to generate revenues and the ways in which the product or service will be sold.

Without a well-defined revenue model, that is, a clear plan of how to generate revenues, new businesses will more likely struggle due to costs that they will not be able to sustain. By having a revenue model, a business can focus on a target audience, fund development plans for a product or service, establish marketing plans, begin a line of credit and raise capital.

==== E-commerce ====
E-commerce (short for "electronic commerce") is trading in products or services using computer networks, such as the Internet. Electronic commerce draws on technologies such as mobile commerce, electronic funds transfer, supply chain management, Internet marketing, online transaction processing, electronic data interchange (EDI), inventory management systems, and automated data collection. Modern electronic commerce typically uses the World Wide Web for at least one part of the transaction's life cycle, although it may also use other technologies such as e-mail.

== Concerns ==
While much has been written of the economic advantages of Internet-enabled commerce, there is also evidence that some aspects of the internet such as maps and location-aware services may serve to reinforce economic inequality and the digital divide. Electronic commerce may be responsible for consolidation and the decline of mom-and-pop, brick and mortar businesses resulting in increases in income inequality.

=== Security ===
E-business systems naturally have greater security risks than traditional business systems, therefore it is important for e-business systems to be fully protected against these risks. A far greater number of people have access to e-businesses through the internet than would have access to a traditional business. Customers, suppliers, employees, and numerous other people use any particular e-business system daily and expect their confidential information to stay secure. Hackers are one of the great threats to the security of e-businesses. Some common security concerns for e-Businesses include keeping business and customer information private and confidential, the authenticity of data, and data integrity. Some of the methods of protecting e-business security and keeping information secure include physical security measures as well as data storage, data transmission, anti-virus software, firewalls, and encryption to list a few.

==== Privacy and confidentiality ====
Confidentiality is the extent to which businesses makes personal information available to other businesses and individuals. With any business, confidential information must remain secure and only be accessible to the intended recipient. However, this becomes even more difficult when dealing with e-businesses specifically. To keep such information secure means protecting any electronic records and files from unauthorized access, as well as ensuring safe transmission and data storage of such information. Tools such as encryption and firewalls manage this specific concern within e-business.

==== Authenticity ====
E-business transactions pose greater challenges for establishing authenticity due to the ease with which electronic information may be altered and copied. Both parties in an e-business transaction want to have the assurance that the other party is who they claim to be, especially when a customer places an order and then submits a payment electronically. One common way to ensure this is to limit access to a network or trusted parties by using a virtual private network (VPN) technology. The establishment of authenticity is even greater when a combination of techniques are used, and such techniques involve checking "something you know" (i.e. password or PIN), "something you need" (i.e. credit card), or "something you are" (i.e. digital signatures or voice recognition methods). Many times in e-business, however, "something you are" is pretty strongly verified by checking the purchaser's "something you have" (i.e. credit card) and "something you know" (i.e. card number).

==== Data integrity ====
Data integrity answers the question "Can the information be changed or corrupted in any way?" This leads to the assurance that the message received is identical to the message sent. A business needs to be confident that data is not changed in transit, whether deliberately or by accident. To help with data integrity, firewalls protect stored data against unauthorized access, while simply backing up data allows recovery should the data or equipment be damaged.

==== Non-repudiation ====
This concern deals with the existence of proof in a transaction. A business must have the assurance that the receiving party or purchaser cannot deny that a transaction has occurred, and this means having sufficient evidence to prove the transaction. One way to address non-repudiation is using digital signatures. A digital signature not only ensures that a message or document has been electronically signed by the person, but since a digital signature can only be created by one person, it also ensures that this person cannot later deny that they provided their signature.

==== Access control ====
When certain electronic resources and information is limited to only a few authorized individuals, a business and its customers must have the assurance that no one else can access the systems or information. There are a variety of techniques to address this concern including firewalls, access privileges, user identification and authentication techniques (such as passwords and digital certificates), Virtual Private Networks (VPN), and much more.

==== Availability ====
This concern is specifically pertinent to a business's customers as certain information must be available when customers need it. Messages must be delivered in a reliable and timely fashion, and information must be stored and retrieved as required. Because the availability of service is important for all e-business websites, steps must be taken to prevent disruption of service by events such as power outages and damage to physical infrastructure. Examples to address this include data backup, fire-suppression systems, Uninterrupted Power Supply (UPS) systems, virus protection, as well as making sure that there is sufficient capacity to handle the demands posed by heavy network traffic.

==== Cost structure ====
The business internet which supports e-business has a cost to maintain of about $2 trillion in outsourced IT dollars just in the United States alone. With each website custom crafted and maintained in code, the maintenance burden is enormous.

The cost structure for e-businesses varies a lot from the industry they operate in. There are two major categories that have commune characteristics. The first group is fully digital businesses that do not provide any products or services outside of the digital world. This includes for example software companies, social networks, etc. For those, the most significant operational cost is the maintenance of the platform. Those costs are almost unrelated to every additional customer the business acquires, making the marginal cost almost equal to zero. This is one of the major advantages of that kind of business. The second group are businesses that provide services or products outside of the digital world, like online shops, for those costs are much harder to determine. Some common advantages over traditional businesses are lower marketing cost, lower inventory cost, lower payroll, lower rent, etc.

=== Security solutions ===
When it comes to security solutions, sustainable electronic business requires support for data integrity, strong authentication, and privacy. Numerous things can be done in order to protect E-Business. Starting off with things such as switching to HTTPS from outdated HTTP protocol which is more vulnerable to attacks. Furthermore, some other improvements that can be made are securing servers and admin panels, payment gateway security, antivirus and anti-malware software, using firewalls, and backing up data.

==== Access and data integrity ====
There are several different ways to prevent access to the data that is kept online. One way is to use anti-virus software. This is something that most people use to protect their networks regardless of the data they have. E-businesses should use this because they can then be sure that the information sent and received to their system is clean. A second way to protect the data is to use firewalls and network protection. A firewall is used to restrict access to private networks, as well as public networks that a company may use. The firewall also has the ability to log attempts into the network and provide warnings as it is happening. They are very beneficial to keep third parties out of the network. Businesses that use Wi-Fi need to consider different forms of protection because these networks are easier for someone to access. They should look into protected access, virtual private networks, or internet protocol security. Another option they have is an intrusion detection system. This system alerts when there are possible intrusions. Some companies set up traps or "hot spots" to attract people and are then able to know when someone is trying to hack into that area.

==== Encryption ====
Encryption, which is actually a part of cryptography, involves transforming texts or messages into a code that is unreadable. These messages have to be decrypted in order to be understandable or usable for someone. There is a key that identifies the data to a certain person or company. With public-key encryption, there are actually two keys used. One is public and one is private. The public one is used for encryption and the private one for decryption. The level of the actual encryption can be adjusted and should be based on the information. The key can be just a simple slide of letters or a completely random mix-up of letters. This is relatively easy to implement because there is software that a company can purchase. A company needs to be sure that its keys are registered with a certificate authority.

==== Digital certificates ====
The point of a digital certificate is to identify the owner of a document. This way the receiver knows that it is an authentic document. Companies can use these certificates in several different ways. They can be used as a replacement for user names and passwords. Each employee can be given these to access the documents that they need from wherever they are. These certificates also use encryption. They are a little more complicated than normal encryption, however. They actually used important information within the code. They do this in order to assure the authenticity of the documents as well as confidentiality and data integrity which always accompany encryption. Digital certificates are not commonly used because they are confusing for people to implement. There can be complications when using different browsers, which means they need to use multiple certificates. The process is being adjusted so that it is easier to use.

==== Digital signatures ====
A final way to secure information online would be to use a digital signature. If a document has a digital signature on it, no one else is able to edit the information without being detected. That way if it is edited, it may be adjusted for reliability after the fact. In order to use a digital signature, one must use a combination of cryptography and a message digest. A message digest is used to give the document a unique value. That value is then encrypted with the sender's private key.

== Advantages and disadvantages ==
=== Advantages ===
When looking at e-business we have many advantages, which are mostly connected to making doing business easier. The benefits of implementing e-business tools are in the streamlining of business processes and not so much in the use of technology. Here are some:

- Easy to set up: electronic business is easy to set up even from home, the only requirements are software, a device and an internet connection.
- Flexible business hours: There are no time barriers that a location-based business can encounter since the internet is available to everyone all the time. Your products and services can be accessed by everyone with an internet connection.
- Cheaper than traditional business: Electronic business is less costly than a traditional business, but it is more expensive to set up. Transactions cost are also cheaper.
- No geographical boundaries: The greatest benefit is the possibility of geographical dispersion. Anyone can order anything from anywhere at any time.
- Government subsidies: Digitalisation is very encouraged by the government and they provide the necessary support.
- Newmarket entry: It has a great potential to enable an entry to a previously unknown market that a traditional business could not.
- Lower levels of inventory: Electronic business enables companies to lower their level of inventory by digitalizing their assets. (i.e.: Netflix does not sell anymore physical DVDs but proposes online streaming content instead).
- Lower costs of marketing and sales: E-commerce allows the actors of the industry to advertise for their product/service offer (i.e.: house rental) at generally lower costs than by promoting physically their business.

=== Disadvantages ===
Despite all the limits, there are also some disadvantages that we need to address. The most common limitations of electronic business are:

- Lack of personal touch: The products cannot be examined or felt before the final purchase. In the traditional model, we have a more personal customer experience, while in the electronic business that is mostly not the case. Another missing factor of personal touch could also be in online transactions.
- Delivery time: Traditional business enables instant satisfaction as you obtain the product the moment you purchase it, while in electronic business that is not possible. There will always be a waiting period before you receive the product. For example, Amazon assures one-day delivery. This does not resolve the issue completely, but it is an improvement.
- Security issues: Scams could be mentioned as a factor for people's distrust in electronic business. Hackers can easily get customers' financial and personal details. Some customer still finds it hard to trust electronic businesses because of the lack of security, reliability and integrity issues.

== See also ==
- Electronic commerce
- Electronic Commerce Modeling Language
- Very Large Business Applications
- Digital economy
- Types of E-commerce
- Shopping cart software
