= Electronic signature =

Data in electronic form, which is logically associated with other data in electronic form

An electronic signature, or e-signature, is data that is logically associated with other data and which is used by the signatory to sign the associated data. This type of signature has the same legal standing as a handwritten signature as long as it adheres to the requirements of the specific regulation under which it was created (e.g., eIDAS in the European Union, NIST-DSS in the USA or ZertES in Switzerland).

Electronic signatures are a legal concept distinct from digital signatures, a cryptographic mechanism often used to implement electronic signatures. While an electronic signature can be as simple as a name entered in an electronic document, digital signatures are increasingly used in e-commerce and in regulatory filings to implement electronic signatures in a cryptographically protected way. Standardization agencies like NIST or ETSI provide standards for their implementation (e.g., NIST-DSS, XAdES or PAdES). The concept itself is not new, with common law jurisdictions having recognized telegraph signatures as far back as the mid-19th century and faxed signatures since the 1980s.

== Description ==
The USA's E-Sign Act, signed June 30, 2000 by President Clinton was described months later as "more like a seal than a signature."

An electronic signature is intended to provide a secure and accurate identification method for the signatory during a transaction. Definitions of electronic signatures vary depending on the applicable jurisdiction. A common denominator in most countries is the level of an advanced electronic signature requiring that:

1. The signatory can be uniquely identified and linked to the signature
2. The signatory must have sole control of the private key that was used to create the electronic signature
3. The signature must be capable of identifying if its accompanying data has been tampered with after the message was signed
4. In the event that the accompanying data has been changed, the signature must be invalidated

Electronic signatures may be created with increasing levels of security, with each having its own set of requirements and means of creation on various levels that prove the validity of the signature. To provide an even stronger probative value than the above described advanced electronic signature, some countries like member states of the European Union or Switzerland introduced the qualified electronic signature. It is difficult to challenge the authorship of a statement signed with a qualified electronic signature - the statement is non-repudiable. Technically, a qualified electronic signature is implemented through an advanced electronic signature that utilizes a digital certificate, which has been encrypted through a security signature-creating device and which has been authenticated by a qualified trust service provider.

== In contract law ==
Since well before the American Civil War began in 1861, morse code was used to send messages electrically via the telegraph. Some of these messages were agreements to terms that were intended as enforceable contracts. An early acceptance of the enforceability of telegraphic messages as electronic signatures came from a New Hampshire Supreme Court case, Howley v. Whipple, in 1869.

In the 1980s, many companies and even some individuals began using fax machines for high-priority or time-sensitive delivery of documents. Although the original signature on the original document was on paper, the image of the signature and its transmission was electronic.

Courts in various jurisdictions have decided that enforceable legality of electronic signatures can include agreements made by email, entering a personal identification number (PIN) into a bank ATM, signing a credit or debit slip with a digital pen pad device (an application of graphics tablet technology) at a point of sale, installing software with a clickwrap software license agreement on the package, and signing electronic documents online.

The first agreement signed electronically by two sovereign nations was a Joint Communiqué recognizing the growing importance of the promotion of electronic commerce, signed by the United States and Ireland in 1998.

=== Enforceability ===
In 1996 the United Nations published the UNCITRAL Model Law on Electronic Commerce. Article 7 of the UNCITRAL Model Law on Electronic Commerce was highly influential in the development of electronic signature laws around the world, including in the US. In 2001, UNCITRAL concluded work on a dedicated text, the UNCITRAL Model Law on Electronic Signatures, which has been adopted in some 30 jurisdictions. Article 9, paragraph 3 of the United Nations Convention on the Use of Electronic Communications in International Contracts, 2005, which establishes a mechanism for functional equivalence between electronic and handwritten signatures at the international level as well as for the cross-border recognition. The latest UNCITRAL text dealing with electronic signatures is article 16 of the UNCITRAL Model Law on the Use and Cross-border Recognition of Identity Management and Trust Services (2022).

Canadian law (PIPEDA) attempts to clarify the situation by first defining a generic electronic signature as "a signature that consists of one or more letters, characters, numbers or other symbols in digital form incorporated in, attached to or associated with an electronic document," then defining a secure electronic signature as an electronic signature with specific properties. PIPEDA's secure electronic signature regulations refine the definition as being a digital signature applied and verified in a specific manner.

In the European Union, EU Regulation No 910/2014 on electronic identification and trust services for electronic transactions in the European internal market (eIDAS) sets the legal frame for electronic signatures. It repeals Directive 1999/93/EC. The current and applicable version of eIDAS was published by the European Parliament and the European Council on July 23, 2014. Following Article 25 (1) of the eIDAS regulation, an advanced electronic signature shall “not be denied legal effect and admissibility as evidence in legal proceedings". However it will reach a higher probative value when enhanced to the level of a qualified electronic signature. By requiring the use of a qualified electronic signature creation device and being based on a certificate that has been issued by a qualified trust service provider, the upgraded advanced signature then carries according to Article 25 (2) of the eIDAS Regulation the same legal value as a handwritten signature. However, this is only regulated in the European Union and similarly through ZertES in Switzerland. A qualified electronic signature is not defined in the United States.

The U.S. Code defines an electronic signature for the purpose of US law as "an electronic sound, symbol, or process, attached to or logically associated with a contract or other record and executed or adopted by a person with the intent to sign the record." It may be an electronic transmission of the document which contains the signature, as in the case of facsimile transmissions, or it may be encoded message, such as telegraphy using Morse code.

In the United States, the definition of what qualifies as an electronic signature is wide and is set out in the Uniform Electronic Transactions Act ("UETA") released by the National Conference of Commissioners on Uniform State Laws (NCCUSL) in 1999. It was influenced by ABA committee white papers and the uniform law promulgated by NCCUSL. Under UETA, the term means "an electronic sound, symbol, or process, attached to or logically associated with a record and executed or adopted by a person with the intent to sign the record." This definition and many other core concepts of UETA are echoed in the U.S. ESign Act of 2000. 48 US states, the District of Columbia, and the US Virgin Islands have enacted UETA. Only New York and Illinois have not enacted UETA, but each of those states has adopted its own electronic signatures statute. As of June 11, 2020, Washington State Office of CIO adopted UETA.

In Australia, an electronic signature is recognised as "not necessarily the writing in of a name, but maybe any mark which identifies it as the act of the party.” Under the Electronic Transactions Acts in each Federal, State and Territory jurisdiction, an electronic signature may be considered enforceable if (a) there was a method used to identify the person and to indicate that person’s intention in respect of the information communicated and the method was either: (i) as reliable as appropriate for the purpose for which the electronic communication was generated or communicated, in light of all the circumstances, including the relevant agreement; or (ii) proven in fact to have fulfilled the functions above by itself or together with further evidence and the person to whom the signature is required to be given consents to that method.

=== Legal definitions ===
Various laws have been passed internationally to facilitate commerce by using electronic records and signatures in interstate and foreign commerce. The intent is to ensure the validity and legal effect of contracts entered electronically. For instance,

PIPEDA (Canadian federal law)
(1) An electronic signature is "a signature that consists of one or more letters, characters, numbers or other symbols in digital form incorporated in, attached to or associated with an electronic document";
(2) A secure electronic signature is an electronic signature that

(a) is unique to the person making the signature;
(b) the technology or process used to make the signature is under the sole control of the person making the signature;
(c) the technology or process can be used to identify the person using the technology or process; and
(d) the electronic signature can be linked with an electronic document in such a way that it can be used to determine whether the electronic document has been changed since the electronic signature was incorporated in, attached to, or associated with the electronic document.

ESIGN Act Sec 106 (US federal law)
(2) ELECTRONIC- The term 'electronic' means relating to technology having electrical, digital, magnetic, wireless, optical, electromagnetic, or similar capabilities.
(4) ELECTRONIC RECORD- The term 'electronic record' means a contract or other record created, generated, sent, communicated, received, or stored by electronic means.
(5) ELECTRONIC SIGNATURE- The term 'electronic signature' means an electronic sound, symbol, or process, attached to or logically associated with a contract or other record and executed or adopted by a person with the intent to sign the record.

Regulation No 910/2014 on electronic identification and trust services for electronic transactions in the internal market Art 3 (European Union regulation)
(10) ‘electronic signature’ means data in electronic form which is attached to or logically associated with other data in electronic form and which is used by the signatory to sign;
(11) ‘advanced electronic signature’ means an electronic signature which meets the requirements set out in Article 26;
(12) ‘qualified electronic signature’ means an advanced electronic signature that is created by a qualified electronic signature creation device, and which is based on a qualified certificate for electronic signatures;

GPEA Sec 1710 (US federal law)
(1) ELECTRONIC SIGNATURE.—the term "electronic signature" means a method of signing an electronic message that—
(A) identifies and authenticates a particular person as the source of the electronic message; and
(B) indicates such person's approval of the information contained in the electronic message.

UETA Sec 2 (US state law)
(5) "Electronic" means relating to technology having electrical, digital, magnetic, wireless, optical, electromagnetic, or similar capabilities.
(6) "Electronic agent" means a computer program or an electronic or other automated means used independently to initiate an action or respond to electronic records or performances in whole or in part, without review or action by an individual.
(7) "Electronic record" means a record created, generated, sent, communicated, received, or stored by electronic means.
(8) "Electronic signature" means an electronic sound, symbol, or process attached to or logically associated with a record and executed or adopted by a person with the intent to sign the record.

Federal Reserve 12 CFR 202 (US federal regulation)
refers to the ESIGN Act

Commodity Futures Trading Commission 17 CFR Part 1 Sec. 1.3 (US federal regulations)
(tt) Electronic signature means an electronic sound, symbol, or process attached to or logically associated with a record and executed or adopted by a person with the intent to sign the record.

Food and Drug Administration 21 CFR Sec. 11.3 (US federal regulations)
(5) Digital signature means an electronic signature based upon cryptographic methods of originator authentication, computed by using a set of rules and a set of parameters such that the signer's identity and the integrity of the data can be verified.
(7) Electronic signature means a computer data compilation of any symbol or series of symbols executed, adopted, or authorized by an individual to be the legally binding equivalent of the individual's handwritten signature.

United States Patent and Trademark Office 37 CFR Sec. 1.4 (federal regulation)
(d)(2) S-signature. An S-signature is a signature inserted between forwarding slash marks, but not a handwritten signature ... (i)The S-signature must consist only of letters, or Arabic numerals, or both, with appropriate spaces and commas, periods, apostrophes, or hyphens for punctuation... (e.g., /Dr. James T. Jones, Jr./)...
(iii) The signer's name must be:
(A) Presented in printed or typed form preferably immediately below or adjacent to the S-signature, and
(B) Reasonably specific enough so that the identity of the signer can be readily recognized.

=== Laws regarding their use ===
- Australia - Electronic Transactions Act 1999 (which incorporates amendments from Electronic Transactions Amendment Act 2011), Section 10 - Signatures specifically relates to electronic signatures.
- Azerbaijan - Electronic Signature and Electronic Document Law (2004)
- Bangladesh - Information and Communication Technology Act, 2006
- Brazil - 2020 Electronic signature Law (Lei de assinaturas eletrônicas); Brazil's National Public Key Certificate Infrastructure Act (Infraestrutura de Chaves Públicas Brasileira - ICP-Brasil)
- Bulgaria - Electronic Document and Electronic Certification Services Act
- Canada - PIPEDA, its regulations, and the Canada Evidence Act.
- China - Law of the People's Republic of China on Electronic Signature (effective April 1, 2005)
- Costa Rica - Digital Signature Law 8454 (2005)
- Croatia 2002, updated 2008
- Czech Republic – currently directly applicable eIDAS and Zákona o službách vytvářejících důvěru pro elektronické transakce - 297/2016 Sb. (effective from 19 September 2016), formerly Zákon o elektronickém podpisu - 227/2000 Sb. (effective from 1 October 2000 until 19 September 2016 when it was derogated)
- Ecuador – Ley de Comercio Electronico Firmas y Mensajes de Datos
- European Union - eIDAS regulation on implementation within the EU is set out in the Digital Signatures and the Law.
- India - Information Technology Act
- Indonesia - Law No. 11/2008 on Information and Electronic Transactions
- Iraq - Electronic Transactions and Electronic Signature Act No 78 in 2012
- Ireland - Electronic Commerce Act 2000
- Japan - Law Concerning Electronic Signatures and Certification Services, 2000
- Kazakhstan - Law on Electronic Document and Electronic Signature (07.01.2003)
- Lithuania - Law on Electronic Identification and Trust Services for Electronic Transactions
- Mexico - E-Commerce Act [2000]
- Malaysia - Digital Signature Act 1997 and Digital Signature Regulation 1998 (https://www.mcmc.gov.my/sectors/digital-signature)
- Moldova - Privind semnătura electronică şi documentul electronic (http://lex.justice.md/md/353612/)
- New Zealand - Contract and Commercial Law Act 2017
- Paraguay - Ley 4017: De validez jurídica de la Firma Electrónica, la Firma Digital, los Mensajes de Datos y el Expediente Electrónico (12/23/2010) (in Spanish), Ley 4610: Que modifica y amplia la Ley 4017/10 (05/07/2012) (in Spanish)
- Peru - Ley Nº 27269. Ley de Firmas y Certificados Digitales (28MAY2000) (in Spanish)
- the Philippines - Electronic Commerce Act of 2000
- Poland - Ustawa o podpisie elektronicznym (Dziennik Ustaw z 2001 r. Nr 130 poz. 1450)
- Romania - LEGE nr. 214 din 5 iulie 2024 privind utilizarea semnăturii electronice, a mărcii temporale și prestarea serviciilor de încredere bazate pe acestea
- Russian Federation - Federal Law of Russian Federation about Electronic Signature (06.04.2011)
- Singapore - Electronic Transactions Act (2010) (background information, differences between ETA 1998 and ETA 2010)
- Slovakia - Zákon č.215/2002 o elektronickom podpise
- Slovenia - Slovene Electronic Commerce and Electronic Signature Act
- South Africa - Electronic Communications and Transactions Act [No. 25 of 2002]
- Spain - Ley 6/2020, de 11 de noviembre, reguladora de determinados aspectos de los servicios electrónicos de confianza
- Switzerland - ZertES
- Republika Srpska (entity of the Bosnia and Herzegovina) 2005
- Thailand - Electronic Transactions Act B.E.2544 (2001)
- Turkey - Electronic Signature Law
- Ukraine - Electronic Signature Law, 2003
- UK - s.7 Electronic Communications Act 2000
- U.S. - Electronic Signatures in Global and National Commerce Act
- U.S. - Uniform Electronic Transactions Act - adopted by 48 states
- U.S. - Government Paperwork Elimination Act (GPEA)
- U.S. - The Uniform Commercial Code (UCC)

=== Usage ===
In 2016, Aberdeen Strategy and Research reported that 73% of "best-in-class" and 34% of all other respondents surveyed made use of electronic signature processes in supply chain and procurement, delivering benefits in the speed and efficiency of key procurement activities. The percentages of their survey respondents using electronic signatures in accounts payable and accounts receivable processes were a little lower, 53% of "best-in-class" respondents in each case.

== Technological implementations (underlying technology) ==
=== Digital signature ===
A diagram showing how a digital signature is applied and then verified

Digital signatures are cryptographic implementations of electronic signatures used as a proof of authenticity, data integrity and non-repudiation of communications conducted over the Internet. When implemented in compliance to digital signature standards, digital signing should offer end-to-end privacy with the signing process being user-friendly and secure. Digital signatures are generated and verified through standardized frameworks such as the Digital Signature Algorithm (DSA) by NIST or in compliance to the XAdES, PAdES or CAdES standards, specified by the ETSI.

There are typically three algorithms involved with the digital signature process:

- Key generation – This algorithm provides a private key along with its corresponding public key.
- Signing – This algorithm produces a signature upon receiving a private key and the message that is being signed.
- Verification – This algorithm checks for the message's authenticity by verifying it along with the signature and public key.

The process of digital signing requires that its accompanying public key can then authenticate the signature generated by both the fixed message and private key. Using these cryptographic algorithms, the user's signature cannot be replicated without having access to their private key. A secure channel is not typically required. By applying asymmetric cryptography methods, the digital signature process prevents several common attacks where the attacker attempts to gain access through the following attack methods.

The most relevant standards on digital signatures with respect to size of domestic markets are the Digital Signature Standard (DSS) by the National Institute of Standards and Technology (NIST) and the eIDAS Regulation enacted by the European Parliament. OpenPGP is a non-proprietary protocol for email encryption through public key cryptography. It is supported by PGP and GnuPG, and some of the S/MIME IETF standards and has evolved into the most popular email encryption standard in the world.

=== Biometric signature ===
An electronic signature may also refer to electronic forms of processing or verifying identity through the use of biometric "signatures" or biologically identifying qualities of an individual. Such signatures use the approach of attaching some biometric measurement to a document as evidence. Biometric signatures include fingerprints, hand geometry (finger lengths and palm size), iris patterns, voice characteristics, retinal patterns, or any other human body property. All of these are collected using electronic sensors of some kind.

Biometric measurements of this type are useless as passwords because they can't be changed if compromised. However, they might be serviceable, except that to date, they have been so easily deceived that they can carry little assurance that the person who purportedly signed a document was actually the person who did. For example, a replay of the electronic signal produced and submitted to the computer system responsible for 'affixing' a signature to a document can be collected via wiretapping techniques. Many commercially available fingerprint sensors have low resolution and can be deceived with inexpensive household items (for example, gummy bear candy gel). In the case of a user's face image, researchers in Vietnam successfully demonstrated in late 2017 how a specially crafted mask could beat Apple's Face ID on iPhone X.

== See also ==
- Authentication
- Long-term validation
- UNCITRAL Model Law on Electronic Signatures (MLES)
