= PAdES =

Advanced electronic signature extension to PDF

PAdES (PDF Advanced Electronic Signatures) is a set of restrictions and extensions to PDF and ISO 32000-1 making it suitable for advanced electronic signatures (AdES). This is published by ETSI as EN 319 142.

== Description ==
While PDF and ISO 32000-1 provide a framework for digitally signing their documents, PAdES specifies precise profiles making it compliant with ETSI standards for digital signatures (Advanced Electronic Signature - AES and Qualified Electronic Signature - QES). ETSI (European Telecommunications Standards Institute) has the function of issuing technical standards by delegation in the EU eIDAS Regulation (European Union Regulation on electronic identification and trust services for electronic transactions in the internal market). The eIDAS regulation enhances and repeals the Electronic Signatures Directive 1999/93/EC. EIDAS is legally binding and in all EU member states since July 2014 and unlike the Directive it replaces, the eIDAS as a Regulation is directly applicable without implementing or interpreting legislation. Any electronic signature recognised under eIDAS (including ‘click accept’) cannot be denied validity and effectiveness by reason of being electronic. If it is a ‘digital signature’ that is, an electronic signature implementing digital certificates in compliance with the advanced or qualified described in eIDAS (and their implementations developed by ETSI from a technology level) it can support PAdES. AES and QES have a higher evidentiary value than simple or ‘standard’ electronic signatures. QES is recognised the same legal value as a handwritten signature.

PAdES standards travel in the same direction and have the same aims as digital signatures (AES and QES). This means they can be easily verified in any PDF reader and as

- it is uniquely linked to the signatory (in QES to the identity of the signatory);
- it is capable of identifying the signatory (‘attribution’);
- only the signatory has control of the data used for the signature creation (in QES control and custody, as a portable token or ID and authentication where a certificate is downloaded for each use from a cloud ID provider);
- it can be, in PAdES easily, identified if data attached to the signature has been changed after signing.

PAdES has 4 levels of verification for digital certificate, from the most simple and basic (b-b, indicating a signature was executed with a certificate that was valid on a date) to the most complex (b-LTV) allowing electronically signed documents to remain valid for long periods (long term validity) even if underlying cryptographic algorithms or the other certificates expired.

As PAdES recognizes that digitally-signed documents may be used or archived for many years, and may need to be evidenced in court, once signer certificates have expired (after a few months on b-b) they can be enquired by contacting the certification authority. In b-lt or b-LTV (the most complex) certificates remain valid for a very long term. PAdES allows certificates to be verified even after many decades at any time in the future, in spite of technological and other advances. If in the document itself the validar to confirm that the signature was valid is concept known as long-term validation (LTV). For long-term preservation, the signed PDF and its embedded PAdES signature are preserved as a single object, because the signature is bound to the byte range of the signed PDF revision.

The PAdES standard, ETSI European Standard (EN) 319 142, introduces a number of adaptations and extensions to PDF to satisfy the Directive's requirements. ETSI will feed these European-specific elements back into ISO for inclusion in the next release of the PDF standard, ISO 32000-2.

== PAdES in the context of electronic signatures ==
An electronic signature is a paperless way to sign a document using a unique credential associated with a given person that is logically attached to or associated with the document, carrying an authority equivalent to a handwritten signature. It can be used to authenticate the signer as well as to detect any changes in the document made after it was signed. Electronic signatures are recognized as a catalyst to electronic commerce, notably Internet transactions. Availability of electronic signature techniques has already been a major stimulus to eBusiness and eGovernment. Digital signatures are a secure and legally binding means to implement electronic signatures through three cryptographic algorithms:

- the key generating algorithm that randomly selects a private key and its corresponding public key
- the signing algorithm that produces the digital signature from the message and private key
- the signature verifying algorithm that uses the public key, message and digital signature to confirm the authenticity of the message.

For PDF documents, the signature data is incorporated directly within the signed PDF document, much as an ink signature becomes an integral part of a paper document, allowing the complete self-contained PDF file to be copied, stored and distributed as a simple electronic file. The signature can also have a visual representation as a form field, just as it might on a paper document. A significant advantage of PAdES is that it is being deployed by means of widely available PDF software: it does not require development or customization of specialized software.

PAdES is complementary to two other standards for an implementation of electronic signatures through cryptographically secured digital signatures in compliance to the eIDAS regulation. Like PAdES, they are legally binding in the European Union and suited for applications that do not involve human-readable documents: Cryptographic Message Syntax Advanced Electronic Signatures (CAdES) and XML Advanced Electronic Signatures (XAdES).

== Legal admissibility ==
The EU recognizes three different eIDAS-compliant implementations of advanced electronic signatures through digital signatures: PAdES, XAdES and CAdES.

An electronic signature can carry legal effect and be used as evidence in legal proceedings. A qualified electronic signature shall have the equivalent legal effect of a handwritten signature. If the qualified certificate was issued in one member state it shall be recognized as a qualified electronic signature in all other member states.

== PAdES Standard (ETSI EN 319 142) ==
The PAdES ETSI technical specification contains 2 parts:

- Part 1: Building blocks and PAdES baseline signatures
- Part 2: Additional PAdES signatures profiles

== See also ==
- European Telecommunications Standards Institute (ETSI)
- PDF
- CAdES, CMS Advanced Electronic Signature
- XAdES, XML Advanced Electronic Signature
- Associated Signature Containers (ASiC)
- Trusted timestamping
- European Union Trusted Lists (EUTL)
