= WCML (disambiguation) =

The West Coast Main Line is a railway route in the United Kingdom.

WCML may also refer to:

- WCML (TV), a television station (channel 24, virtual 6) licensed to serve Alpena, Michigan, United States
- WCML-FM, a radio station (91.7 FM) licensed to serve Alpena, Michigan
- Working Class Movement Library, a collection of English-language material relating institutions of the working class
