= Santel Phin =

Cambodian blogger and writer

Santel Phin is a Cambodian blogger and writer. He is the founder of KhmerBird.

== Early life ==
In 2006, Santal Phin started his own blog called KhmerBird in order to share the nation's criminal story with the outside world. There was a nightmare in Cambodia that many people known as Khmer Rouge. Many people died in Cambodia during the rule of the communist red Khmer. But there were not many people in the world outside Cambodia that knew this criminal story.

Santel Phin decided to create his blog to let people all around the world know just how evil the communist red Khmers were.

In 2012 his blog, KhmerBird, became the fifth most visited blog in Cambodia. Also, He was recognized as a best Cambodia nation adviser who encourage the young to start blogging and online business.

As everyone in Cambodia knew Khmer Rouge killed many knowledgeable persons almost of the whole country of Cambodia, after the Khmer Rouge Cambodia are less original authors. Santel Phin is one of few authors who wrote the original story in Cambodia, after the Khmer Rouge. He was recognized as a writer after the slaughter.

== Education and career ==
Santal Phin holds a degree in engineering from ICT. He is an IT project manager by profession. Furthermore, he is involved in many NGOs, conferences and training to build more capacities of Cambodian resources.

== Publication works ==
In 2013, Santel Phin published his first book of short stories and poems called Cambodia in My Dream. It is his best book from his 10 years of writing. It is the first of his books to win the NouHach Award in Cambodia.
