= UNCITRAL Model Law on Electronic Transferable Records =

The UNCITRAL Model Law on Electronic Transferable Records (“MLETR”) is a uniform model law that has been adopted by the United Nations Commission on International Trade Law (UNCITRAL) in 2017. Its scope is to allow the use of transferable documents and instruments in electronic form. Transferable documents and instruments typically include bills of lading, warehouse receipts, bills of exchange, promissory notes and cheques. National law qualifies a document or instrument as transferable.

Transferable documents and instruments allow to request delivery of goods and payment of a sum of money based on possession of the document or instrument. However, it has been difficult to reproduce the notion of possession, which has to do with control over tangible goods, in an electronic environment. The MLETR addresses that legal gap.

Under the MLETR each dematerialised document does not need to be managed in a separate information system, but the same system could manage multiple documents, or also all documents related to a business transactions. This may allow to merge logistics and supply chain, or even commercial and regulatory documents, in a single electronic transferable record.

== Economic benefits ==
A study on the impact of the adoption of a law aligned to the MLETR in the United Kingdom has quantified the benefits of such adoption. Besides economic benefits, which include up to £224 billion in efficiency savings, adoption of such legislation may reduce the number of days needed for processing trade documents by up to 75%.

The impact assessment of the Electronic Trade Documents Bill (see below) prepared by the UK Government estimates in the next 10 years economic benefits ranging from a low estimate of 249.8 million pounds to a high estimate of 2,049.7 million pounds, with a best estimate of 1,137.0 million pounds.

At the micro-economic level, a study describing 16 case studies of application of the UK Electronic Trade Documents Act (which is aligned with MLETR) and associated economic benefits is available.

== Main provisions ==
The MLETR is divided in four chapters: general provisions; provisions on functional equivalence; use of electronic transferable records; and cross-border recognition of electronic transferable records.

=== General provisions ===
The MLETR is built on the same fundamental principles of other UNCITRAL texts on electronic commerce, namely functional equivalence (articles 8-11 MLETR), technology neutrality and non-discrimination against the use of electronic means (article 7 MLETR).

The MLETR is also model-neutral and may be implemented by using registries, tokens or distributed ledgers. The Explanatory Note to the MLETR provides some guidance on the use of distributed ledgers in implementing the MLETR and is therefore considered an early example of legislative text facilitating the use of blockchain.

Article 2 MLETR defines the notion of electronic transferable record as an electronic record that complies with the requirements of article 10 MLETR. It also defines "transferable document or instrument" as a document that entitles its holder to the payment of a sum of money or the delivery of goods.

Article 6 MLETR legally recognizes the possibility of including metadata in electronic transferable records. It is therefore considered a smart contract enabler.

=== Provisions on functional equivalence ===
Articles 8 and 9 MLETR provide functional equivalence rules, respectively, for the paper-based notions of "writing" and "signature". Those articles do not need to be enacted if national law, for instance an electronic transactions act, already contains those notions and they are made applicable by reference to electronic transferable records.

Article 10 MLETR establishes the conditions for functional equivalence between paper-based transferable documents and instruments, on the one hand, and electronic transferable records, on the other hand. Those conditions are: 1) the electronic transferable record shall contain all information required for the corresponding paper-based transferable document or instrument; 2) a reliable method shall be used: a) to identify the electronic transferable record as such; b) to render the electronic transferable record subject to control throughout its life-cycle; c) to retain the integrity of the electronic transferable record throughout its life-cycle.

Article 11 MLETR establishes the functional equivalence rule for possession of a transferable document or instrument. The conditions to satisfy that requirement are the use of a reliable method to establish exclusive control of the electronic transferable record and the identification of the person in control.

Article 10 and 11 MLETR are based on the notions of "control" and "singularity" of the electronic transferable record.

=== Use of electronic transferable records ===
In general, all events that may occur in relation to a transferable document or instrument may also occur in relation to an electronic transferable record. Articles 15 and 16 MLETR reaffirm that general rule with respect to, respectively, endorsement and amendment of an electronic transferable record. The amendment should be identified as such as otherwise the electronic nature may not make the amendment easily recognisable.

Article 12 MLETR contains a non-exclusive list of elements relevant to assess the reliability of the method used. It contains also a safety clause that indicates that a method is reliable in fact if it has fulfilled the function it pursued, alone or with other evidence.

=== Cross-border recognition of electronic transferable records ===
Article 19 MLETR contains a provision on geographic non-discrimination of the electronic transferable record. The provision does not affect private international law rules.

== Status ==
=== National enactments ===
The MLETR has been enacted in Bahrain, in Belize, in France, in Kiribati, in Paraguay, in Papua New Guinea, in Singapore, in Timor-Leste, in the United Kingdom, and in the Abu Dhabi Global Market (ADGM), an International Financial Centre located in Abu Dhabi, United Arab Emirates.

The adoption of the MLETR in Bahrain has taken place in conjunction with a review of the Electronic Transactions Act, which was originally passed in 2002 and is based on the UNCITRAL Model Law on Electronic Commerce.

Singapore had conducted two public consultations prior to enactment, the first in March 2017 and the second in summer 2019, in the broader framework of the review of the Electronic Transactions Act.

In Thailand, the Cabinet has approved the inclusion of the MLETR in the Electronic Transactions Act. Czechia has conducted a public consultation on MLETR adoption.

=== International endorsements ===
The International Chamber of Commerce (ICC) has been promoting actively adoption of the MLETR. Initially, this was done to facilitate the use of electronic bills of lading as recommended in a report by the law firm Clyde & Co and the ICC Banking Commission. MLETR adoption is now being actively promoted by the ICC Digital Standards Initiative (DSI), including as a manner to overcome the effects of the COVID-19 pandemic and to increase supply chain resilience. ICC DSI offers also guidance on MLETR implementation, including technical standards and business practices.

On 28 April 2021 the UK, Canada, France, Germany, Italy, Japan, the US and the European Union adopted a G7 Digital and Technology Ministerial Declaration to develop a framework for the use of electronic transferable records that promotes the adoption of legal frameworks compatible with the principles of the MLETR.

On 11 May 2022, the G7 Digital Ministers adopted a Ministerial Declaration endorsing the “Principles for domestic legal frameworks to promote the use of electronic transferable records” contained in Annex 2 to the Declaration.

The G7 declarations have prompted the consideration of MLETR adoption in G7 member States, with significant impact:

- In the UK, the Electronic Trade Documents Act, 2023, has entered into force on 20 September 2023;
- In Germany, a regulation implementing existing provisions on electronic bills of lading, warehouse receipts and other transferable documents has been drafted; the regulation implements core MLETR provisions;
- In France, a report recommending the adoption of MLETR has been prepared and the relevant ministries have accepted it with a view to its prompt implementation. On that basis, a bill has been adopted;
- In Japan, a study group was set up to consider the adoption of the MLETR with regard to bills of lading.

== Implementation ==
With respect to use in business practice, one provider has started offering issuance of electronic bills of lading based on Singapore law incorporating MLETR and approved by the International Group of P&I Club as of 1 July 2021. These electronic bills of lading issued under the law of Singapore and MLETR have been used for the first time to cover shipments from Australia to China.

In Bahrain, an electronic check system has been launched based on MLETR provisions incorporated in Bahraini law. It allows issuing, endorsing and presenting electronic checks on mobile phones and other devices.
