= XAdES =

Digital signature extensions

XAdES (short for XML Advanced Electronic Signatures) is a set of extensions to XML-DSig recommendation making it suitable for advanced electronic signatures. W3C and ETSI maintain and update XAdES together.

== Description ==
While XML-DSig is a general framework for digitally signing documents, XAdES specifies precise profiles of XML-DSig making it compliant with the European eIDAS regulation (Regulation on electronic identification and trust services for electronic transactions in the internal market). The eIDAS regulation enhances and repeals the Electronic Signatures Directive 1999/93/EC. EIDAS is legally binding in all EU member states since July 2014. An electronic signature that has been created in compliance with eIDAS has the same legal value as a handwritten signature.

An electronic signature, technically implemented based on XAdES has the status of an advanced electronic signature. This means that

- it is uniquely linked to the signatory;
- it is capable of identifying the signatory;
- only the signatory has control of the data used for the signature creation;
- it can be identified if data attached to the signature has been changed after signing.

A resulting property of XAdES is that electronically signed documents can remain valid for long periods, even if underlying cryptographic algorithms are broken.

However, courts are not obliged to accept XAdES-based electronic signatures as evidence in their proceedings; at least in EU, this is compulsory only for "qualified" signatures. A "qualified electronic signature" needs to be doted with a digital certificate, encrypted by a security signature creation device, and the identity of the owner of this signing-certificate must have been verified according to the "high" assurance level of the eIDAS regulation.

== Profiles ==
XAdES defines four profiles (forms) differing in protection level offered.

- XAdES-B-B (Basic Electronic Signature), The lowest and simplest version just containing the SignedInfo, SignatureValue, KeyInfo and SignedProperties. This form extends the definition of an electronic signature to conform to the identified signature policy.
- XAdES-B-T (Signature with a timestamp), A timestamp regarding the time of signing is added to protect against repudiation.
- XAdES-B-LT (Signature with Long Term Data), Certificates and revocation data are embedded to allow verification in the future even if their original source is not available.
- XAdES-B-LTA (Signature with Long Term Data and Archive timestamp), By using periodical timestamping (e.g. each year) compromising is prevented which could be caused by weakening previous signatures during a long-time storage period.

In February 2016, ETSI publishes the document ETSI EN 319 132-1 V1.1.0 as final draft for a European Standard. In this draft, the profiles have been omitted.

== See also ==
- European Telecommunications Standards Institute (ETSI)
- XML Signature
- CAdES, CMS Advanced Electronic Signature
- PAdES, PDF Advanced Electronic Signature
- ASiC, Associated Signature Containers (ASiC)
- Trusted timestamping
