= Digital signature =

Mathematical scheme for verifying the authenticity of digital documents

Alice signs a message—"Hello Bob!"—by appending a signature which is computed from the message and her private key. Bob receives both the message and signature. He uses Alice's public key to verify the authenticity of the signed message.

A digital signature is a mathematical scheme for verifying the authenticity of digital messages or documents. A valid digital signature on a message gives any recipient confidence that the message came from a sender known to the recipient. In contrast, a message authentication code only gives confidence to a specific recipient that the message came from a known sender.

Digital signatures are a type of public-key cryptography, and are commonly used for software distribution, financial transactions, contract management software, and in other cases where it is important to detect forgery or tampering.

A digital signature on a message or document is similar to a handwritten signature on paper, but it is not restricted to a physical medium like paper—any bitstring can be digitally signed—and while a handwritten signature on paper could be copied onto other paper in a forgery, a digital signature on a message is mathematically bound to the content of the message so that it is infeasible for anyone to forge a valid digital signature on any other message.

Digital signatures are often used to implement electronic signatures, which include any electronic data that carries the intent of a signature, but not all electronic signatures use digital signatures.

== Definition ==
A digital signature scheme consists of three algorithms:

- A key generation algorithm that selects a private key at random from a set of possible private keys. The algorithm outputs the private key and a corresponding public key.
- A signing algorithm that, given a message and a private key, produces a signature.
- A signature verifying algorithm that, given the message, public key and signature, either accepts or rejects the message's claim to authenticity.

Two main properties are required:

1. Correctness: Signatures produced by the signing algorithm with a private key pass the verification algorithm with the corresponding public key.
2. Security (existential unforgeability under chosen-message attack, or EUF-CMA): It should be computationally infeasible to generate a valid signature for a party without knowing that party's private key.

Formally, a digital signature scheme is a triple of probabilistic polynomial-time algorithms, (G, S, V), satisfying:

- G (key-generator) generates a public key (pk), and a corresponding private key (sk), on input 1^{n}, where n is the security parameter.
- S (signing) returns a tag, t, on the inputs: the private key (sk), and a string (x).
- V (verifying) outputs accepted or rejected on the inputs: the public key (pk), a string (x), and a tag (t).

Here 1^{n} refers to a unary number in the formalism of computational complexity theory.

For correctness, S and V must satisfy

Pr [(pk, sk) ← G(1^{n}), V(pk, x, S(sk, x)) = accepted] = 1.

A digital signature scheme is secure if for every non-uniform probabilistic polynomial time adversary A,

Pr [(pk, sk) ← G(1^{n}), (x, t) ← A^{S(sk, · )}(pk, 1^{n}), x ∉ Q, V(pk, x, t) = accepted] < negl(n),

where A^{S(sk, · )} denotes that A has access to the oracle, S(sk, · ), Q denotes the set of the queries on S made by A, which knows the public key, pk, and the security parameter, n, and x ∉ Q denotes that the adversary may not directly query the string, x, on S.

== History ==
In 1976, Whitfield Diffie and Martin Hellman first described the notion of a digital signature scheme, although they only conjectured that such schemes existed based on functions that are trapdoor one-way permutations. Soon afterwards, Ronald Rivest, Adi Shamir, and Len Adleman invented the RSA algorithm, which could be used to produce primitive digital signatures (although only as a proof-of-concept – "plain" RSA signatures are not secure). The first widely marketed software package to offer digital signature was Lotus Notes 1.0, released in 1989, which used the RSA algorithm.

Other digital signature schemes were soon developed after RSA, the earliest being Lamport signatures, Merkle signatures (also known as "Merkle trees" or simply "Hash trees"), and Rabin signatures.

In 1988, Shafi Goldwasser, Silvio Micali, and Ronald Rivest became the first to rigorously define the security requirements of digital signature schemes. They described a hierarchy of attack models for signature schemes, and also presented the GMR signature scheme, the first that could be proved to prevent even an existential forgery against a chosen message attack, which is the currently accepted security definition for signature schemes. The first such scheme which is not built on trapdoor functions but rather on a family of function with a much weaker required property of one-way permutation was presented by Moni Naor and Moti Yung.

== Method ==
One digital signature scheme (of many) is based on RSA. To create signature keys, generate an RSA key pair containing a modulus, N, that is the product of two random secret distinct large primes, along with integers, e and d, such that e d ≡ 1 (mod φ(N)), where φ is Euler's totient function. The signer's public key consists of N and e, and the signer's secret key contains d.

Used directly, this type of signature scheme is vulnerable to key-only existential forgery attack. To create a forgery, the attacker picks a random signature σ and uses the verification procedure to determine the message, m, corresponding to that signature. In practice, however, this type of signature is not used directly, but rather, the message to be signed is first hashed to produce a short digest, that is then padded to larger width comparable to N, then signed with the reverse trapdoor function. This forgery attack, then, only produces the padded hash function output that corresponds to σ, but not a message that leads to that value, which does not lead to an attack. In the random oracle model, hash-then-sign (an idealized version of that practice where hash and padding combined have close to N possible outputs), this form of signature is existentially unforgeable, even against a chosen-plaintext attack.

There are several reasons to sign such a hash (or message digest) instead of the whole document.

For efficiency
The signature will be much shorter and thus save time since hashing is generally much faster than signing in practice.
For compatibility
Messages are typically bit strings, but some signature schemes operate on other domains (such as, in the case of RSA, numbers modulo a composite number N). A hash function can be used to convert an arbitrary input into the proper format.
For integrity
Without the hash function, the text "to be signed" may have to be split (separated) in blocks small enough for the signature scheme to act on them directly. However, the receiver of the signed blocks is not able to recognize if all the blocks are present and in the appropriate order.

== Applications ==
As organizations move away from paper documents with ink signatures or authenticity stamps, digital signatures can provide added assurances of the evidence to provenance, identity, and status of an electronic document as well as acknowledging informed consent and approval by a signatory. The United States Government Printing Office (GPO) publishes electronic versions of the budget, public and private laws, and congressional bills with digital signatures. Universities including Penn State, University of Chicago, and Stanford are publishing electronic student transcripts with digital signatures.

Below are some common reasons for applying a digital signature to communications:

=== Authentication ===
A message may have letterhead or a handwritten signature identifying its sender, but letterheads and handwritten signatures can be copied and pasted onto forged messages. Even legitimate messages may be modified in transit.

If a bank's central office receives a letter claiming to be from a branch office with instructions to change the balance of an account, the central bankers need to be sure, before acting on the instructions, that they were actually sent by a branch banker, and not forged—whether a forger fabricated the whole letter, or just modified an existing letter in transit by adding some digits.

With a digital signature scheme, the central office can arrange beforehand to have a public key on file whose private key is known only to the branch office. The branch office can later sign a message and the central office can use the public key to verify the signed message was not a forgery before acting on it. A forger who doesn't know the sender's private key can't sign a different message, or even change a single digit in an existing message without making the recipient's signature verification fail.

Encryption can hide the content of the message from an eavesdropper, but encryption on its own may not let recipient verify the message's authenticity, or even detect selective modifications like changing a digit—if the bank's offices simply encrypted the messages they exchange, they could still be vulnerable to forgery. In other applications, such as software updates, the messages are not secret—when a software author publishes a patch for all existing installations of the software to apply, the patch itself is not secret, but computers running the software must verify the authenticity of the patch before applying it, lest they become victims to malware.

==== Limitations ====
Replays. A digital signature scheme on its own does not prevent a valid signed message from being recorded and then maliciously reused in a replay attack. For example, the branch office may legitimately request that bank transfer be issued once in a signed message. If the bank doesn't use a system of transaction IDs in their messages to detect which transfers have already happened, someone could illegitimately reuse the same signed message many times to drain an account.

Uniqueness and malleability of signatures. A signature itself cannot be used to uniquely identify the message it signs—in some signature schemes, every message has a large number of possible valid signatures from the same signer, and it may be easy, even without knowledge of the private key, to transform one valid signature into another. If signatures are misused as transaction IDs in an attempt by a bank-like system such as a Bitcoin exchange to detect replays, this can be exploited to replay transactions.

Authenticating a public key. Prior knowledge of a public key can be used to verify authenticity of a signed message, but not the other way around—prior knowledge of a signed message cannot be used to verify authenticity of a public key. In some signature schemes, given a signed message, it is easy to construct a public key under which the signed message will pass verification, even without knowledge of the private key that was used to make the signed message in the first place.

=== Non-repudiation ===
Non-repudiation, or more specifically non-repudiation of origin, is an important aspect of digital signatures. By this property, an entity that has signed some information cannot at a later time deny having signed it. Similarly, access to the public key only does not enable a fraudulent party to fake a valid signature.

Note that these authentication, non-repudiation etc. properties rely on the secret key not having been revoked prior to its usage. Public revocation of a key-pair is a required ability, else leaked secret keys would continue to implicate the claimed owner of the key-pair. Checking revocation status requires an "online" check; e.g., checking a certificate revocation list or via the Online Certificate Status Protocol. Very roughly this is analogous to a vendor who receives credit-cards first checking online with the credit-card issuer to find if a given card has been reported lost or stolen. Of course, with stolen key pairs, the theft is often discovered only after the secret key's use, e.g., to sign a bogus certificate for espionage purpose.

== Notions of security ==
In their foundational paper, Goldwasser, Micali, and Rivest lay out a hierarchy of attack models against digital signatures:

1. In a key-only attack, the attacker is only given the public verification key.
2. In a known message attack, the attacker is given valid signatures for a variety of messages known by the attacker but not chosen by the attacker.
3. In an adaptive chosen message attack, the attacker first learns signatures on arbitrary messages of the attacker's choice.

They also describe a hierarchy of attack results:

1. A total break results in the recovery of the signing key.
2. A universal forgery attack results in the ability to forge signatures for any message.
3. A selective forgery attack results in a signature on a message of the adversary's choice.
4. An existential forgery merely results in some valid message/signature pair not already known to the adversary.

The strongest notion of security, therefore, is security against existential forgery under an adaptive chosen message attack.

== Additional security precautions ==
=== Putting the private key on a smart card ===
All public key / private key cryptosystems depend entirely on keeping the private key secret. A private key can be stored on a user's computer, and protected by a local password, but this has two disadvantages:

- the user can only sign documents on that particular computer
- the security of the private key depends entirely on the security of the computer

A more secure alternative is to store the private key on a smart card. Many smart cards are designed to be tamper-resistant (although some designs have been broken, notably by Ross Anderson and his students). In a typical digital signature implementation, the hash calculated from the document is sent to the smart card, whose CPU signs the hash using the stored private key of the user, and then returns the signed hash. Typically, a user must activate their smart card by entering a personal identification number or PIN code (thus providing two-factor authentication). It can be arranged that the private key never leaves the smart card, although this is not always implemented. If the smart card is stolen, the thief will still need the PIN code to generate a digital signature. This reduces the security of the scheme to that of the PIN system, although it still requires an attacker to possess the card. A mitigating factor is that private keys, if generated and stored on smart cards, are usually regarded as difficult to copy, and are assumed to exist in exactly one copy. Thus, the loss of the smart card may be detected by the owner and the corresponding certificate can be immediately revoked. Private keys that are protected by software only may be easier to copy, and such compromises are far more difficult to detect.

=== Using smart card readers with a separate keyboard ===
Entering a PIN code to activate the smart card commonly requires a numeric keypad. Some card readers have their own numeric keypad. This is safer than using a card reader integrated into a PC, and then entering the PIN using that computer's keyboard. Readers with a numeric keypad are meant to circumvent the eavesdropping threat where the computer might be running a keystroke logger, potentially compromising the PIN code. Specialized card readers are also less vulnerable to tampering with their software or hardware and are often EAL3 certified.

=== Other smart card designs ===
Smart card design is an active field, and there are smart card schemes which are intended to avoid these particular problems, despite having few security proofs so far.

=== Using digital signatures only with trusted applications ===
One of the main differences between a digital signature and a written signature is that the user does not "see" what they sign. The user application presents a hash code to be signed by the digital signing algorithm using the private key. An attacker who gains control of the user's PC can possibly replace the user application with a foreign substitute, in effect replacing the user's own communications with those of the attacker. This could allow a malicious application to trick a user into signing any document by displaying the user's original on-screen, but presenting the attacker's own documents to the signing application.

To protect against this scenario, an authentication system can be set up between the user's application (word processor, email client, etc.) and the signing application. The general idea is to provide some means for both the user application and signing application to verify each other's integrity. For example, the signing application may require all requests to come from digitally signed binaries.

=== Using a network attached hardware security module ===
One of the main differences between a cloud based digital signature service and a locally provided one is risk. Many risk averse companies, including governments, financial and medical institutions, and payment processors require more secure standards, like FIPS 140-2 level 3 and FIPS 201 certification, to ensure the signature is validated and secure.

=== WYSIWYS ===
Technically speaking, a digital signature applies to a string of bits, whereas humans and applications "believe" that they sign the semantic interpretation of those bits. In order to be semantically interpreted, the bit string must be transformed into a form that is meaningful for humans and applications, and this is done through a combination of hardware and software based processes on a computer system. The problem is that the semantic interpretation of bits can change as a function of the processes used to transform the bits into semantic content. It is relatively easy to change the interpretation of a digital document by implementing changes on the computer system where the document is being processed. From a semantic perspective this creates uncertainty about what exactly has been signed. WYSIWYS (What You See Is What You Sign) means that the semantic interpretation of a signed message cannot be changed. In particular this also means that a message cannot contain hidden information that the signer is unaware of, and that can be revealed after the signature has been applied. WYSIWYS is a requirement for the validity of digital signatures, but this requirement is difficult to guarantee because of the increasing complexity of modern computer systems. The term WYSIWYS was coined by Peter Landrock and Torben Pedersen to describe some of the principles in delivering secure and legally binding digital signatures for Pan-European projects.

=== Digital signatures versus ink on paper signatures ===
An ink signature could be replicated from one document to another by copying the image manually or digitally, but to have credible signature copies that can resist some scrutiny is a significant manual or technical skill, and to produce ink signature copies that resist professional scrutiny is very difficult.

Digital signatures cryptographically bind an electronic identity to an electronic document and the digital signature cannot be copied to another document. Paper contracts sometimes have the ink signature block on the last page, and the previous pages may be replaced after a signature is applied. Digital signatures can be applied to an entire document, such that the digital signature on the last page will indicate tampering if any data on any of the pages have been altered, but this can also be achieved by signing with ink and numbering all pages of the contract.

== Some digital signature algorithms ==
- RSA
- DSA
- ECDSA
- EdDSA
- RSA with SHA
- ECDSA with SHA
- ElGamal signature scheme as the predecessor to DSA, and variants Schnorr signature and Pointcheval–Stern signature algorithm
- Rabin signature algorithm
- Pairing-based schemes such as BLS
- CRYSTALS-Dilithium, a quantum-resistant scheme based on LWE in lattices
- Falcon, a quantum-resistant scheme based on CVP in lattices
- SPHINCS+, a quantum-resistant scheme based on hash functions
- Undeniable signatures
- Aggregate signature – a signature scheme that supports aggregation: Given n signatures on n messages from n users, it is possible to aggregate all these signatures into a single signature whose size is constant in the number of users. This single signature will convince the verifier that the n users did indeed sign the n original messages. A scheme by Mihir Bellare and Gregory Neven may be used with Bitcoin.
- Signatures with efficient protocols – are signature schemes that facilitate efficient cryptographic protocols such as zero-knowledge proofs or secure computation.

== The current state of use – legal and practical ==
Most digital signature schemes share the following goals regardless of cryptographic theory or legal provision:

1. Quality algorithms: Some public-key algorithms are known to be insecure, as practical attacks against them have been discovered.
2. Quality implementations: An implementation of a good algorithm (or protocol) with mistake(s) will not work.
3. Users (and their software) must carry out the signature protocol properly.
4. The private key must remain private: If the private key becomes known to any other party, that party can produce perfect digital signatures of anything.
5. The public key owner must be verifiable: A public key associated with Bob actually came from Bob. This is commonly done using a public key infrastructure (PKI) and the public key↔user association is attested by the operator of the PKI (called a certificate authority). For 'open' PKIs in which anyone can request such an attestation (universally embodied in a cryptographically protected public key certificate), the possibility of mistaken attestation is non-trivial. Commercial PKI operators have suffered several publicly known problems. Such mistakes could lead to falsely signed, and thus wrongly attributed, documents. 'Closed' PKI systems are more expensive, but less easily subverted in this way.

Only if all of these conditions are met will a digital signature actually be any evidence of who sent the message, and therefore of their assent to its contents. Legal enactment cannot change this reality of the existing engineering possibilities, though some such have not reflected this actuality.

Legislatures, being importuned by businesses expecting to profit from operating a PKI, or by the technological avant-garde advocating new solutions to old problems, have enacted statutes and/or regulations in many jurisdictions authorizing, endorsing, encouraging, or permitting digital signatures and providing for (or limiting) their legal effect. The first appears to have been in Utah in the United States, followed closely by the states Massachusetts and California. Other countries have also passed statutes or issued regulations in this area as well and the UN has had an active model law project for some time. These enactments (or proposed enactments) vary from place to place, have typically embodied expectations at variance (optimistically or pessimistically) with the state of the underlying cryptographic engineering, and have had the net effect of confusing potential users and specifiers, nearly all of whom are not cryptographically knowledgeable.

Adoption of technical standards for digital signatures have lagged behind much of the legislation, delaying a more or less unified engineering position on interoperability, algorithm choice, key lengths, and so on what the engineering is attempting to provide.

== Industry standards ==
Some industries have established common interoperability standards for the use of digital signatures between members of the industry and with regulators. These include the Automotive Network Exchange for the automobile industry and the SAFE-BioPharma Association for the healthcare industry.

=== Using separate key pairs for signing and encryption ===
In several countries, a digital signature has a status somewhat like that of a traditional pen and paper signature, as in the 1999 EU digital signature directive and 2014 EU follow-on legislation. Generally, these provisions mean that anything digitally signed legally binds the signer of the document to the terms therein. For that reason, it is often thought best to use separate key pairs for encrypting and signing. Using the encryption key pair, a person can engage in an encrypted conversation (e.g., regarding a real estate transaction), but the encryption does not legally sign every message he or she sends. Only when both parties come to an agreement do they sign a contract with their signing keys, and only then are they legally bound by the terms of a specific document. After signing, the document can be sent over the encrypted link. If a signing key is lost or compromised, it can be revoked to mitigate any future transactions. If an encryption key is lost, a backup or key escrow should be utilized to continue viewing encrypted content. Signing keys should never be backed up or escrowed unless the backup destination is securely encrypted.

== See also ==
- 21 CFR 11
- X.509
- Advanced electronic signature
- Blind signature
- Detached signature
- Public key certificate
- Digital signature in Estonia
- Electronic lab notebook
- Electronic signature
- Electronic signatures and law
- eSign (India)
- GNU Privacy Guard
- Public key infrastructure
- Public key fingerprint
- Server-based signatures
- Probabilistic signature scheme
