= Ethereum Classic =

Blockchain computing platform

- Ethereum Classic
- Original author(s): Vitalik Buterin, Gavin Wood
- Developer(s): Open-source software development
- Initial release: 30 July 2015; 11 years ago
- Stable release: Spiral / 4 February 2024; 2 years ago
- Development status: Active
- Software used: EVM 61 bytecode
- Funding: Open source software
- Written in: C++, Go, Python, Rust, Scala
- Operating system: Cross-platform
- Platform: x86-64, ARM
- Size: Archive: 771GB / Snap Sync: 72GB (3 October 2023)
- Available in: Global
- Type: Cryptocurrency
- License: Open-source licenses
- As of: November 2026
- Average performance: 12.444 seconds average block time
- Active users: 34,906 lifetime average daily transactions
- Total users: 716.177 million addresses
- Total hosts: 515 nodes
- Website: ethereumclassic.org

Ethereum Classic is a blockchain-based distributed computing platform that offers smart contract (scripting) functionality. Ethereum Classic was created in a hard fork with the mainline Ethereum blockchain, and maintains the original, unaltered ledger prior to the attempt to reverse a hacking attack on the Ethereum-based DAO in July 2016. It is now the largest smart contract platform secured by a proof-of-work consensus mechanism, following Ethereum's transition to proof-of-stake in 2022. It is open source and supports a modified version of Nakamoto consensus via transaction-based state transitions executed on a public Ethereum Virtual Machine (EVM).

Ethereum Classic maintains the original, unaltered history of the Ethereum network. The Ethereum project's mainnet was initially released via Frontier on 30 July 2015. However, due to a hack of a third-party project, The DAO, the Ethereum Foundation created a new version of the Ethereum mainnet on 20 July 2016 with an irregular state change implemented that erased the DAO theft from the Ethereum blockchain history. The Ethereum Foundation applied their trademark to the new, altered version of the Ethereum blockchain. The older, unaltered version of Ethereum was renamed and continued as Ethereum Classic.

Ethereum Classic's native Ether token is a cryptocurrency traded on digital currency exchanges under the currency code ETC. Ether is created as a reward to network nodes for a process known as "mining", which validates computations performed on Ethereum Classic's EVM.

== Milestones ==
=== Frontier ===
Several codenamed prototypes of the Ethereum platform were developed by the Ethereum Foundation, as part of their proof-of-concept series, prior to the official launch of the Frontier network. Ethereum Classic followed this codebase after the DAO incident.

Date	Block	Milestone name
2015-07-30	0	Frontier
2015-07-30	1	5M20 Era 1
2015-09-08	200,000	Ice Age
2016-03-15	1,150,000	Homestead
2016-07-20	1,920,000	"Ethereum Classic" Rebrand
2016-10-24	2,500,000	Gas Reprice
2017-01-13	3,000,000	Die Hard
2017-12-11	5,000,000	Gotham
2017-12-11	5,000,001	5M20 Era 2
2018-05-29	5,900,000	Defuse Difficulty Bomb
2019-09-12	8,772,000	Atlantis
2020-01-11	9,573,000	Agharta
2020-03-17	10,000,001	5M20 Era 3
2020-06-01	10,500,839	Phoenix
2020-11-28	11,700,000	Thanos
2021-07-23	13,189,133	Magneto
2022-02-12	14,525,000	Mystique
2022-04-25	15,000,001	5M20 Era 4
2022-09-15	15,950,000	Largest PoW EVM
2024-02-04	19,250,000	Spiral
2024-05-30	20,000,001	5M20 Era 5
TBD	25,000,001	5M20 Era 6

=== The DAO bailout ===
On 20 July 2016, as a result of the exploitation of a flaw in The DAO project's smart contract software, and subsequent theft of $50 million worth of Ether, the Ethereum network split into two separate blockchains – the altered history was named Ethereum (ETH) and the unaltered history was named Ethereum Classic (ETC).

- The new chain with the altered history was branded as Ethereum (code: ETH) with the BIP-44 Coin Index 60 and EVM Chain ID 1 attributed to it by the trademark-owning Ethereum Foundation. On this new chain, the history of the theft was erased from the Ethereum blockchain.
- Some members of the Ethereum community ignored the change and continued to participate on the original Ethereum network. The non-fork chain with an unaltered history continued on as Ethereum Classic (code: ETC) with the BIP-44 Coin Index 61 and EVM Chain ID 61.

==== Security vulnerabilities disclosed ====
On 28 May 2016, a paper was released detailing security vulnerabilities with the DAO that could allow Ether to be stolen. On 9 June 2016, Peter Vessenes publicly disclosed the existence of a critical security vulnerability overlooked in many Solidity contracts, a recursive call bug. On 12 June 2016, Stephan Tual publicly claimed that the DAO funds were safe despite the newly-discovered critical security flaw.

==== Carbon vote ====
On 15 July 2016, a short notice on-chain vote was held on the DAO hard fork. Of the 82,054,716 ETH in existence, only 4,542,416 voted, for a total voter turn out of 5.5% of the total supply on 16 July 2016; 3,964,516 ETH (87%) voted in favor, 1/4 of which came from a single address, and 577,899 ETH (13%) opposed the DAO fork. The expedited process of the carbon vote drew criticism from opponents of the DAO fork. Proponents of the fork were quick to market the vote as an effective consensus mechanism, pushing forward with the DAO fork four days later.

==== Block 1,920,000 ====
The first Ethereum Classic block that was not included in the forked Ethereum chain was block number 1,920,000, which was generated by Ethereum Classic miners on 20 July 2016.

=== Defuse Difficulty Bomb ===
A mechanism called the "Difficulty Bomb" was designed to push the Ethereum chain from proof-of-work consensus mechanism to proof-of-stake in the future by exponentially increasing the difficulty of mining. This Difficulty Bomb was added to the network on block 200,000 in an upgrade named "Ice Age". While Ethereum Classic participants debated the merits of the Difficulty Bomb, a network upgrade called "Die Hard" at block 3,000,000 delayed the effects of the mechanism. Once the network participants came to consensus on the issue, Ethereum Classic upgraded its network on block 5,900,000 to permanently defuse the Difficulty Bomb. This abandoned a future with proof-of-stake and committed the network to the proof-of-work consensus mechanism.

=== EVM standard protocol parity ===
Date	ETC EVM upgrade	ETH EVM version
2016-10-24	Gas Reprice	Tangerine Whistle
2017-01-13	Die Hard	Spurious Dragon
2019-09-12	Atlantis	Byzantium
2020-01-11	Agharta	Constantinople + Petersburg
2020-06-01	Phoenix	Istanbul
2021-07-23	Magneto	Berlin
2022-02-12	Mystique	London
2024-02-04	Spiral	Shanghai

After the Ethereum Classic and Ethereum Foundation hard fork in 2016, multiple versions of the EVM existed. This led to the realization of the need for an interoperable EVM standard to connect multiple EVMs. In an attempt to modernize the Ethereum Classic EVM, several protocol upgrades were scheduled to activate features that the Ethereum network already enabled over the past years. Atlantis, activated in September 2019, enabled the Agharta upgrade, which included the outstanding Byzantium changes. Agharta was followed by the incorporation of the Constantinople patches through the January 2020 upgrade. Finally, with the Phoenix upgrade, Ethereum Classic achieved protocol parity with Ethereum, allowing for fully cross-compatible applications between the two networks. The Ethereum Classic development community continues to maintain protocol parity with the greater EVM standard. Development moves slowly, only updating stable versions of EVM standard.

=== ETChash mining algorithm ===
After a series of 51% attacks on the Ethereum Classic network in 2020, a change to the underlying Ethash mining algorithm was considered by the community to prevent being a minority proof-of-work chain in the Ethash mining algorithm where Ethereum is dominating the hashrate. After evaluating various options such as Monero's RandomX or the standardized SHA-3-256, it was eventually decided to double the Ethash epoch duration from 30,000 to 60,000 in order to reduce the DAG size and prevent Ethash miners to easily switch to Ethereum Classic. This modified Ethash is also referred to as ETChash or Thanos upgrade.

=== Leading proof-of-work smart contract platform ===
Following Ethereum's transition to a proof-of-stake consensus mechanism in 2022, Ethereum Classic achieved a notable milestone by becoming the largest and most secure proof-of-work blockchain supporting smart contract functionality. In 2025, the network's ETChash hashrate surpassed 300 terahashes per second (TH/s), a level not observed since Ethereum's DeFi summer boom cycle. Ethereum Classic subsequently established itself as the leading blockchain utilizing the Ethash algorithm family.

== Characteristics ==
Ether (ETC)
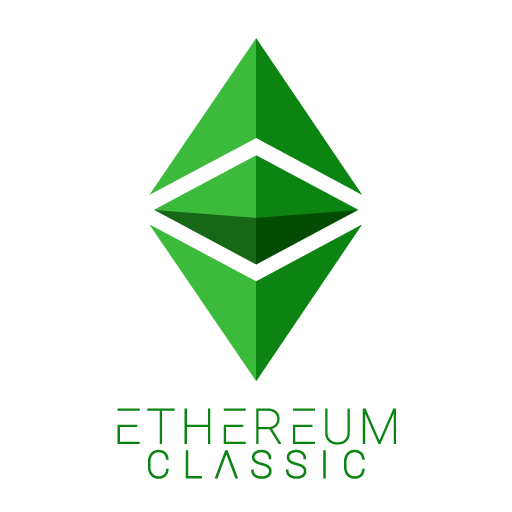
- ETC logo

Denominations
- Plural: Ether(s)
- Symbol: Ξ
- Code: ETC
- Nickname: Ether Classic, Eth Classic, Classic
- Previous names: Ethereum, ETH, Eth
- Precision: 18
- Subunits
- 10^{−9}: Gwei
- 10^{−18}: Wei

Development
- Original author(s): Vitalik Buterin, Gavin Wood
- White paper: ethereum whitepaper
- Implementation: EVM 61
- Initial release: Frontier / 30 July 2015; 11 years ago
- Latest release: Spiral / 4 February 2024; 2 years ago
- Code repository: github.com/ethereumclassic
- Development status: Active
- Written in: C++, Go, Python, Rust, Scala
- Operating system: Cross-platform
- Developer: Open-source software development
- Source model: Open-source model
- License: Open-source licenses

Ledger
- Ledger start: 30 July 2015; 11 years ago
- Split height: #1,920,000 / 20 July 2016; 10 years ago
- Split from: Ethereum (ETH)
- Split ratio: 1:1
- Timestamping scheme: Proof-of-Work - Ethash
- Hash function: Keccak
- Issuance schedule: Block reward reduction of 20% every 5,000,000 blocks
- Block reward: 2.048 Ξ + Uncle rewards
- Block time: 13.914 secs
- Block explorer: Blockscout
- Supply limit: 210,700,000

Valuation
- Exchange rate: Floating

Website
- Website: ethereumclassic.org

As with other cryptocurrencies, the validity of each ether is provided by a blockchain, which is a continuously growing list of records, called "blocks", which are linked and secured using cryptography. By design, the blockchain is inherently resistant to modification of the data. It is an open, distributed ledger that records transactions between two parties efficiently and in a verifiable and permanent way. Unlike bitcoin, Ethereum Classic operates using accounts and balances in a manner called state transitions. This does not rely upon unspent transaction outputs (UTXOs). The state denotes the current balances of all accounts and extra data. The state is not stored on the blockchain, it is stored in a separate Merkle Patricia tree. A cryptocurrency wallet stores the public and private "keys" or "addresses" which can be used to receive or spend Ether. These can be generated through BIP 39 style mnemonics for a BIP 32 "HD wallet". In the Ethereum tech stack, this is unnecessary as it does not operate in a UTXO scheme. With the private key, it is possible to write in the blockchain, effectively making an ether transaction.

To send Ether to an account, the Keccak-256 hash of the public key of that account is needed. Ether accounts are pseudonymous in that they are not linked to individual persons, but rather to one or more specific addresses.

=== Ether ===
ETC is a fundamental token for operation of Ethereum Classic, which thereby provides a public distributed ledger for transactions. It is used to pay for Gas, a unit of computation used in transactions and other state transitions. Within the context of Ethereum Classic it might be called ether, but it should not be confused with ETH, which is also called ether.

It is listed under the currency code ETC and traded on cryptocurrency exchanges, and the Greek uppercase Xi character (Ξ) is generally used for its currency symbol. It is also used to pay for transaction fees and computational services on the Ethereum Classic network.

=== Addresses ===
Ethereum Classic addresses are composed of the prefix "0x", a common identifier for hexadecimal, concatenated with the rightmost 20 bytes of the Keccak-256 hash (big endian) of the ECDSA public key (the curve used is the so-called secp256k1, the same as bitcoin). In hexadecimal, two digits represent a byte, meaning addresses contain 40 hexadecimal digits. An example of an Ethereum Classic address is 0xb794f5ea0ba39494ce839613fffba74279579268. Contract addresses are in the same format, however, they are determined by sender and creation transaction nonce. User accounts are indistinguishable from contract accounts given only an address for each and no blockchain data. Any valid Keccak-256 hash put into the described format is valid, even if it does not correspond to an account with a private key or a contract. This is unlike bitcoin, which uses base58check to ensure that addresses are properly typed.

=== Monetary policy ===
On 11 December 2017, the total supply of Ether on Ethereum Classic was hard capped at ETC 210,700,000 via the Gotham hard fork upgrade. This added a bitcoin-inspired deflationary emission schedule that is documented in Ethereum Classic Improvement Proposal (ECIP) 1017. The emission schedule, also known as "5M20", reduces the block reward by 20% every 5,000,000 blocks. Socially, this block reward reduction event has taken the moniker of "the fifthening".

ETA Date	Date	5M20 era	Block	Block reward	Total era emission	Total emission
-	30 July 2015	Era 1	1	5 Ξ	25,000,000 Ξ	25,000,000 Ξ
December 2017	11 December 2017	Era 2	5,000,001	4 Ξ	20,000,000 Ξ	45,000,000 Ξ
March 2020	17 March 2020	Era 3	10,000,001	3.2 Ξ	16,000,000 Ξ	61,000,000 Ξ
April 2022	25 April 2022	Era 4	15,000,001	2.56 Ξ	12,800,000 Ξ	73,000,000 Ξ
May 2024	30 May 2024	Era 5	20,000,001	2.048 Ξ	10,240,000 Ξ	83,240,000 Ξ
August 2026	-	Era 6	25,000,001	1.6384 Ξ	8,192,000 Ξ	91,480,000 Ξ
~2028	-	Era 7	30,000,001	1.31072 Ξ	6,553,600 Ξ	98,033,000 Ξ
~2030	-	Era 8	35,000,001	1.048576 Ξ	5,242,880 Ξ	103,275,880 Ξ

=== Ethereum Classic Improvement Proposal ===
The Ethereum Classic Improvement Proposal (ECIP) process enables engineers and computer scientists to propose modifications, upgrades, or fixes. Any software developer who is a GitHub user is allowed to make contributions to the ECIP process. There is a number of ECIP types, each listed in the table below.

ECIP Types
Type	Explanation
Standard Track	Any change that affects most or all Ethereum Classic implementations
Core	Improvements requiring a consensus fork
Networking	Improvements to networking protocol specifications
Interface	improvements around client API/RPC specifications and standards and certain language-level standards
ECBP	Application-level standards and conventions, including contract standards
Meta	Proposes a change to, or an event in, a process and often requires community consensus
Informational	Discussing a design flaw in Ethereum Classic or offering general guidelines or information to the Ethereum Classic community, without suggesting the addition of a new feature

== "Code is law" ==
Supporters of Ethereum Classic argue that blockchain immutability is paramount, and that code should be treated as final ("code is law"). Opponents of this view, including the Ethereum Foundation, contended that recovering stolen DAO funds was justified to preserve user trust and that protocol governance must allow for exceptional intervention in extreme cases. The Ethereum community split over these philosophical differences, leading to the creation of two competing networks. "Code is law" refers to the idea that the code is above all else including law from outside forces such as a government. The law is written into the code, therefore, anything the code allows is legal.

== Attacks ==
=== The DAO fork replay attacks ===
On 20 July 2016, due to reliance on the same clients, the DAO fork created a replay attack where a transaction was broadcast on both the ETC and ETH networks. On 13 January 2017, the Ethereum Classic network was updated to resolve transaction replay attacks. The networks are now officially operating separately.

=== RHG sells stolen ETC ===
On 10 August 2016, the ETH proponent Robin Hood Group transferred 2.9 million stolen ETC to Poloniex in an attempt to sell ETC for ETH on the advice of Bitly SA; 14% was successfully converted to ETH and other currencies, 86% was frozen by Poloniex. On 30 August 2016, Poloniex returned the ETC funds to the RHG. They set up a refund contract on the ETC network.

=== Classic Ether Wallet website attack ===
On 29 June 2017, the Ethereum Classic Twitter account made a public statement indicating reason to believe that the website for Classic Ether Wallet had been compromised. The Ethereum Classic Twitter account confirmed the details released via Threatpost. The Ethereum Classic team worked with Cloudflare to place a warning on the compromised domain warning users of the phishing attack.

=== 51% double spend attacks ===
Ethereum Classic (ETC) has experienced two major 51% double-spending attacks in its history. These attacks exploit the decentralized nature of the network by gaining control of more than 50% of its mining power, allowing malicious actors to reorganize the blockchain, manipulate transactions, and double-spend digital assets.

The first significant incident occurred in January 2019, when Ethereum Classic was targeted by a double-spending attack resulting in approximately US$1.1 million worth of ETC being fraudulently spent. The second major 51% attack took place in August 2020, on the fourth anniversary of the 2016 hard fork. This attack involved a series of deep chain reorganizations, leading to estimated losses of US$5.6 million and US$1.68 million from centralized exchanges, respectively.

In response, the Ethereum Classic development community considered several network upgrades and ultimately adopted a modified version of the Ethash proof-of-work (PoW) consensus algorithm, known as ETChash. This change was implemented through the "ECIP-1099 Thanos Upgrade" in November 2020. The upgrade recalibrated the Directed Acyclic Graph (DAG) by reducing its size and slowing its growth rate by half, enabling 3GB Ethash mining hardware to continue securing the network. This adjustment also positioned Ethereum Classic to benefit from Ethash-compatible hardware rendered obsolete by blockchains adhering to the original DAG growth schedule.

Following the Thanos Upgrade, Ethereum Classic's hashrate began a steady increase, eventually becoming the largest blockchain secured by the Ethash mining algorithm. In 2025, the ETChash network hashrate surpassed 300 terahashes per second (TH/s), a level not seen since Ethereum's "DeFi summer." As a result, Ethereum Classic solidified its position as the leading proof-of-work smart contract platform.

== Founding team and early contributors ==
In the immediate aftermath of the 2016 Ethereum hard fork, Ethereum Classic did not establish a formal foundation or central governing body. Instead, a small group of early contributors coordinated efforts to stabilise the network, maintain client software, support ecosystem development, and articulate the project's philosophical and technical direction.

=== Early coordination and technical leadership ===
A small core group played a coordinating role during Ethereum Classic's formation and early development:

- Arvicco acted as a coordinator, facilitating communication among developers, miners, exchanges, and community members during the network's early stabilisation period.
- Dr. Avtar Sehra focused on strategy and governance-related work, including early discussions on monetary policy, protocol governance, and ecosystem development. Key focus was on driving engagement with legal, institutional, and developer communities.
- Igor Artamonov served as Chief Technology Officer (CTO), leading technical stewardship of Ethereum Classic clients and supporting protocol continuity following the split.

This group did not function as a formal governing authority but helped provide organisational coherence during a period when the network lacked established structures.

=== Monetary policy and protocol direction ===
One of the earliest areas of focus within Ethereum Classic, led by Avtar Sehra, was monetary policy. Early contributors advocated for clearer and more predictable issuance rules, in contrast to Ethereum's flexible monetary design at the time. These discussions contributed to community support for freezing the difficulty bomb – a mechanism originally embedded in Ethereum to incentivise protocol upgrades – through the Diehard hard fork in January 2017.

=== Chain identity and improvement proposals ===
In October 2016, Avtar Sehra authored ECIP-1011, one of the first major Ethereum Classic Improvement Proposals (ECIP). The proposal introduced a decentralised chain identifier (chain ID) mechanism designed to prevent replay attacks between Ethereum and Ethereum Classic following the fork.

The concept of chain identification introduced in ECIP-1011 was later adopted within Ethereum and became a standard component of chain identity across Ethereum-compatible networks.

=== Additional contributors ===
Other early contributors to Ethereum Classic included:

- Elaine Ou, who focused on product thinking and helped articulate Ethereum Classic's positioning and narrative during its early development.
- Cody Burns, who supported client and protocol development alongside other developers, many of whom remained anonymous.

=== Community-driven development ===
Ethereum Classic's early development relied primarily on volunteer contributors and community coordination rather than a centralised foundation. This approach reflected the project's emphasis on immutability, decentralisation, and minimal governance intervention – principles that continue to influence its development philosophy.
