= Gavin Wood =

British computer programmer and entrepreneur

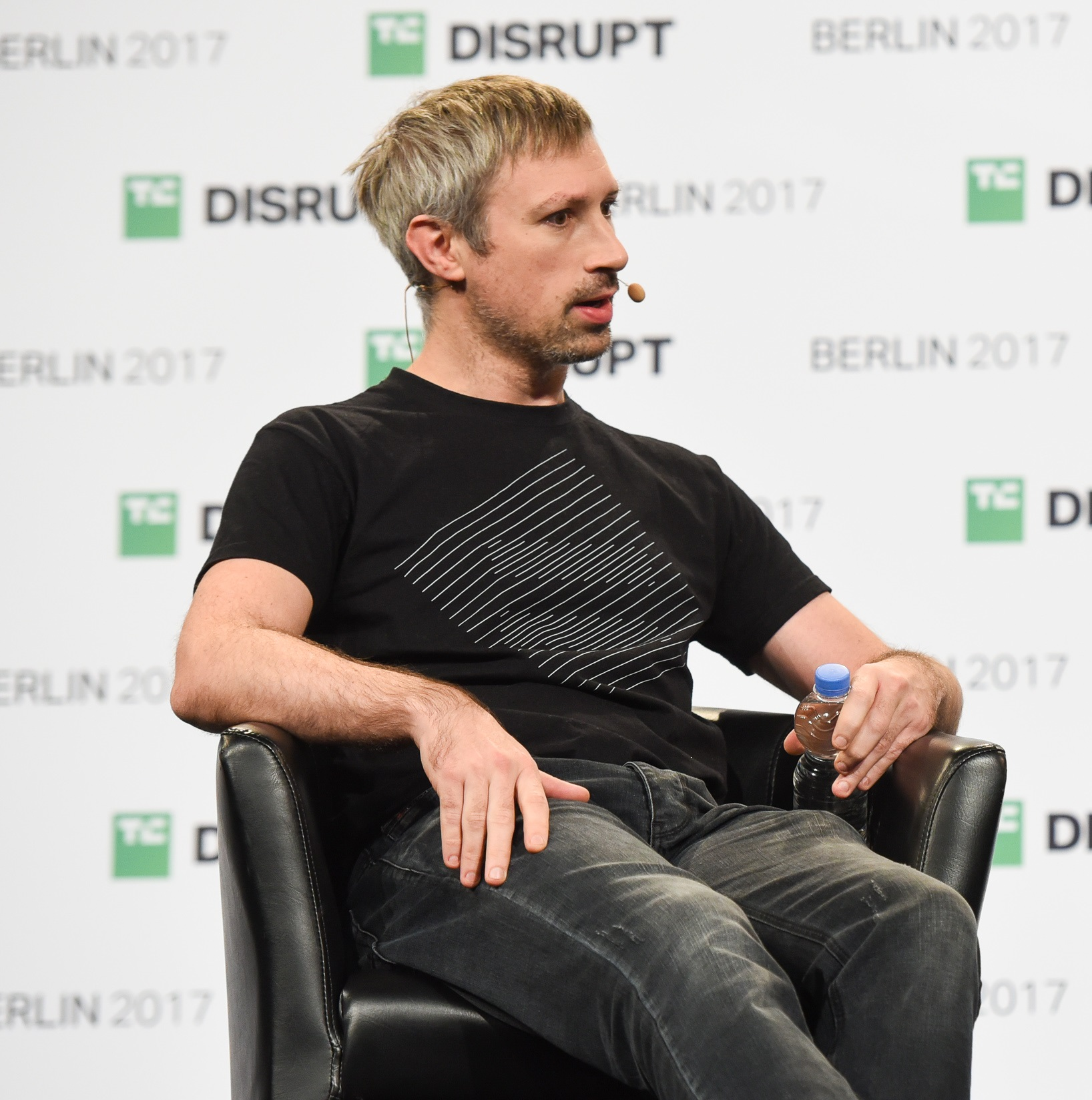
- Wood in TechCrunch Disrupt Event in Berlin 2017
- Born: Gavin James Wood; Lancaster, England
- Education: Lancaster Royal Grammar School
- Alma mater: University of York
- Known for: Co-founder of Ethereum and former CTO of the Ethereum Foundation; co-founder of Polkadot; CWO and Chairman of Parity Technologies; author of the Polkadot White Paper and the Ethereum Yellow Paper
- Scientific career
- Thesis: Content-based visualisation to aid common navigation of musical audio (2005)
- Website: gavwood.com

Gavin James Wood is an English computer scientist, a co-founder of Ethereum, and creator of Polkadot and Kusama. He coined the phrase Web 3.0 in 2014.

== Early life ==
Wood was born in Lancaster, England, United Kingdom. He attended the Lancaster Royal Grammar School. He graduated from the University of York with a Master of Engineering (MEng) in Computer Systems and Software Engineering in 2002 and completed his PhD entitled "Content-based visualization to aid common navigation of musical audio" in 2005, introducing the concept of a Moodbar.

== Career ==
Before working on Ethereum, Wood was a research scientist at Microsoft. He was one of the founders of the Ethereum blockchain, which he has described as "one computer for the entire planet," with Vitalik Buterin, Charles Hoskinson, Anthony Di Iorio, and Joseph Lubin during 2013–2014. Wood proposed and helped develop Solidity, a programming language for writing smart contracts. He also released the paper defining the Ethereum Virtual Machine, the runtime system for smart contracts in Ethereum, in 2014. He also served as the Ethereum Foundation's first chief technology officer. Wood left the Ethereum Foundation in January 2016.

Wood founded Parity Technologies (formerly Ethcore), which developed a client for the Ethereum network and creates software for companies using blockchain technology, with Jutta Steiner, who also previously worked at the Ethereum Foundation. The company released the Parity Ethereum software client, written in Rust, in early 2016. He held the title of chief web officer at Parity in 2018.

He founded the Web3 Foundation, a nonprofit organisation focusing on decentralised internet infrastructure and technology, starting with the Polkadot network.

In Nov. of 2021, Wired described him as the "father of Web3," noting he coined the term Web3 (as Web 3.0) in 2014. Wired stated he believed that decentralized technology would help preserve liberal democracy. In 2021, he ran the Web3 Foundation, and Parity Technologies. He was based in Switzerland. In 2025, his main focus was on Polkadot, and was involved in a speaking tour on the technology.

== Charity ==
Amid 2022 Russian invasion of Ukraine Wood donated $5.8 million in cryptocurrency to support Ukraine.

== Publications ==
- Ethereum: A Secure Decentralised Generalised Transaction Ledger
- Polkadot: Vision for a Heterogenous Multi-Chain Framework
