= Hyperbridge =

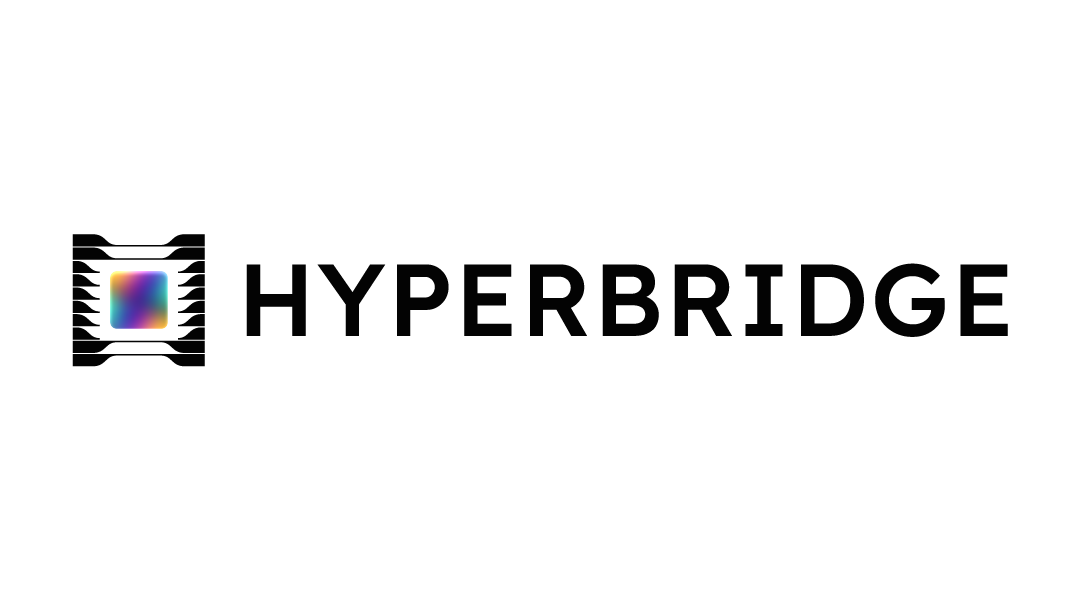
- Other names: Hyper-scalable Bridge
- Original authors: Seun Lenlege and David Salami
- Developer: Polytope Labs
- Release: 2024
- Written in: Rust
- Operating system: Cross-platform
- Platform: Polkadot Parachain
- License: Open-source (Apache 2.0 / GPL)
- Website: https://hyperbridge.network/

Hyperbridge is a cross-chain interoperability bridge that uses cryptographic protocols to facilitate the transfer of assets and data between different blockchains. Hyperbridge was launched on Polkadot mainnet in 2024 by Polytope Labs. The protocol is designed with a decentralised verification system which eliminates traditional reliance on blockchain validators, addressing the limitations of traditional bridges.

The cryptocurrency native to the protocol is BRIDGE, stylised as $BRIDGE.

== History ==
In 2023, software engineers Seun Lanlege and David Salami founded Polytope Labs, a blockchain research and development company. In 2024, the company launched Hyperbridge as its flagship project with the intention to tackle infrastructure challenges in blockchain interoperability and scalability.

Lanlege previously worked at Parity Technologies, where he contributed to projects such as Parity-Ethereum, Substrate, and Polkadot. David Salami, who is also the Chief Technology Officer at Hyperbridge worked at Composable Finance and Commonwealth Lab, where he focused on interoperability technologies, including the Inter-Blockchain Communication (IBC) protocol.

Hyperbridge raised its seed round on September 11, 2024, led by the Polkadot Ecosystem Fund, a joint venture between the Web3 Foundation and venture capital firm Scytale Digital. The platform raised an additional US$2.8 million through a public sale.

The project has also announced partnerships with several Web3 initiatives, including a documented collaboration with Bifrost to expand liquid stacking solutions across multiple chains, as well as partnerships with Astar, Gnosis, ZkVerify, and Sonieum.

Polkadot’s treasury also dedicated 795,000 DOT, approximately worth $3M, to a “DeFi Singularity” initiative, with Hyperbridge serving as the native bridge to enable seamless DOT transfers across chains. Hyperbridge was officially launched on Polkadot mainnet with native support for Ethereum, Base, Gnosis, Optimism, Arbitrum, Polygon and BNB Smart Chain.

Cross-chain bridges have been a recurring target for attackers: Chainalysis reported that bridge hacks accounted for 64% of the funds stolen from decentralized finance protocols in 2022.

== Concept ==
Hyperbridge is an interoperability coprocessor that allows off-chain computation of resource-intensive tasks, while leveraging Polkadot's consensus validators and BEEFY (Bridge Efficiency Enabling Finality Yielder) finality proof to attest to finalised parachain states.

It shares this computation workload across multiple parachain cores, essentially parallel validation threads enabling hyperbridge to process consensus proofs, state proofs, and state-transition re-executions at scale. The cross-chain messages processed from multiple connected blockchains, which are verified on multiple parachain cores, are aggregated into a single zk (zero knowledge) proof that can be verified cheaply on any blockchain, thereby increasing efficiency.

Hyperbridge presents verifiable cryptographic proofs on-chain to validate results of off-chain computation, ensuring crypto-economic security and efficient cross-chain message passing.

In an interview with TechCabal, Seun Lanlege stated that Hyperbridge was designed as a “truly decentralised bridge” using cryptographic proofs rather than multisignature systems, aiming to resolve the long-standing interoperability challenge among blockchain networks. Built on the Polkadot network, Hyperbridge leverages decentralised validation to enable secure cross-chain asset transfer. As of 2025, the protocol has processed over 10 million finality proofs and $92 million in transaction volume.

== April 2026 exploit ==
In April 2026, Hyperbridge suffered a security exploit affecting its Token Gateway and DOT pools on connected EVM networks after an attacker used a forged cross-chain message to gain control of the bridged DOT token contract, mint 1 billion bridged DOT tokens, and sell them into available liquidity. Initial realised losses were reported at about US$237,000 because the bridged DOT pool had limited liquidity, while a later post-incident assessment revised total realised losses across Ethereum, Base, BNB Chain and Arbitrum to about US$2.5 million.

== Supported networks and integrations ==
Hyperbridge natively supports multiple major blockchains, especially EVM-compatible networks. At the launch, it included Ethereum, Layer-2s Optimism, Arbitrum, Polygon, Base (Coinbase’s L2), BNB Smart Chain, and Gnosis Chain.

== See also ==
- Blockchain
- Ethereum
- Interoperability
- Polkadot (blockchain platform)
- Proof of stake
- Zero-knowledge proof
