= Web3 =

Concept of a World Wide Web based on public blockchains

Web3 is an idea for a new iteration of the World Wide Web which incorporates concepts such as decentralization, blockchain technologies, tokenomics, and privacy-enhancing technologies. The term is sometimes confused with the Semantic Web, as both have sometimes been referred to as "Web 3.0". Some technologists and journalists have contrasted it with Web 2.0, in which they say user-generated content is controlled by a small group of companies referred to as Big Tech. The term "web 3.0" as applied to blockchain technology was coined in 2014 by Ethereum co-founder Gavin Wood, and the idea gained interest in 2021 from cryptocurrency enthusiasts, large technology companies, and venture capital firms.

Academic surveys describe Web3 as combining smart contract platforms, peer-to-peer networks, and cryptographic mechanisms, while noting trade-offs involving scalability, interoperability, and governance.

Critics have expressed concerns over the centralization of wealth to a small group of investors and individuals, or a loss of privacy due to more expansive data collection. Billionaires like Elon Musk and Jack Dorsey have argued that web3 only serves as a buzzword or marketing term.

== Background ==
Web 1.0 and Web 2.0 refer to eras in the history of the World Wide Web as it evolved through various technologies and formats. Web 1.0 refers roughly to the period from 1991 to 2004, where most sites consisted of static pages, and the vast majority of users were consumers, not producers of content. Web 2.0 is based around the idea of "the web as platform" and centers on user-created content uploaded to forums, social media and networking services, blogs, and wikis, among other services. Web 2.0 is generally considered to have begun around 2004 and continues to the current day.

== Terminology and concept ==
Web3 is distinct from Tim Berners-Lee's 1999 concept of a Semantic Web, which was also sometimes referred to as Web 3.0. While the Semantic Web envisioned a web of linked data, web3 in the blockchain context refers to a decentralized internet built upon distributed ledger technologies. Ethereum co-founder Gavin Wood first popularized the use of the term Web 3.0 in a blockchain context in 2014. Wood used the term to refer to a "decentralized online ecosystem based on blockchain". "Web3" and "Web 3.0" have been used interchangeably by later writers, leading to confusion between the two concepts. In popular and industry usage, "Web 3.0" is sometimes used interchangeably with "web3" to refer to blockchain-based proposals rather than the Semantic Web.

The definition of the term has been described by Bloomberg journalist Olga Kharif as "hazy", but it revolves around the idea of decentralization and often incorporate blockchain technologies, such as various cryptocurrencies and non-fungible tokens (NFTs). Kharif has described web3 as an idea that "would build financial assets, in the form of tokens, into the inner workings of almost anything you do online". Web3 has been proposed as a possible response to the over-centralization of the web in a few Big Tech companies. Web3 could potentially improve data security, scalability, and privacy. According Kharif in December 2021, skeptics say the idea "is a long way from proving its use beyond niche applications, many of them tools aimed at crypto traders". DuPont et al (2024) describe web3 as an umbrella term for NFTs, cryptocurrency, and blockchain which appeals to users who are "not necessarily plugged into the cypher-punk or crypto-anarchist ideals of Bitcoin". Rohn (2025) describes the term as synonymous with "blockchain economy".

In 2019, The Conversation quoted legal scholars discussing concerns over the difficulty of regulating a decentralized web, which they reported might make it more difficult to prevent cybercrime, online harassment, hate speech, and the dissemination of child sexual abuse material. The concept of Web3 has also been described as a part of a cryptocurrency bubble, and as an extension of harmful and short-lived blockchain-based trends such as NFTs. The use of cryptocurrencies, NFTs, and blockchains in general also introduce potential harmful environmental effects. Others have expressed beliefs that web3 and the associated technologies are a pyramid scheme.

A policy brief published by the Bennett Institute for Public Policy at the University of Cambridge in March 2022 defined web3 as "the putative next generation of the web's technical, legal, and payments infrastructure—including blockchain, smart contracts and cryptocurrencies".

Web3 proposals often include decentralized autonomous organizations (DAOs) and decentralized finance (DeFi).

=== Decentralization ===
Ethics professor Kevin Werbach said in 2021 that "many so-called 'Web 3.0' solutions are not as decentralized as they seem, while others have yet to show they are scalable, secure and accessible enough for the mass market", adding that this "may change, but it's not a given that all these limitations will be overcome".

In early 2022, Moxie Marlinspike, creator of Signal, wrote about web3 as not being as decentralized as it appears to be, mainly due to consolidation in the cryptocurrency field, including in blockchain application programming interfaces which are currently mainly controlled by the companies Alchemy and Infura; cryptocurrency exchanges which are mainly dominated by Binance, Coinbase, MetaMask, and OpenSea; and the stablecoin market which is currently dominated by Tether. Marlinspike also remarked that the new web resembles the old web.

== Reception ==
In 2021, interest in the web3 concept began to increase. Particular interest spiked toward the end of 2021, largely due to interest from cryptocurrency enthusiasts and investments from high-profile technologists and companies. Executives from venture capital firm Andreessen Horowitz traveled to Washington, DC, in October 2021 to lobby for the idea as a potential solution to questions about regulation of the web, with which policymakers have been grappling. The New York Times and Fortune reported in December 2021 that $27 billion had been invested in blockchain projects due to interest in the Web3 concept.

In late 2021, Reddit, Discord, and other Web 2.0 companies experimented with incorporating web3 technologies into their platforms. On November 8, 2021, Discord CEO Jason Citron tweeted a screenshot suggesting the platform might be integrating cryptocurrency wallets into their platform. Two days later, and after heavy user backlash, Discord announced they had no plans to integrate such technologies and that it was an internal-only concept that had been developed in a company-wide hackathon.

In November 2021, James Grimmelmann of Cornell University referred to web3 as vaporware, calling it "a promised future internet that fixes all the things people don't like about the current internet, even when it's contradictory". Grimmelmann also argued that moving the internet toward a blockchain-focused infrastructure would centralize and cause more data collection compared to the current internet. In December 2021, software engineer Stephen Diehl described Web3 as a "vapid marketing campaign that attempts to reframe the public's negative associations of crypto assets into a false narrative about disruption of legacy tech company hegemony". Liam Proven, writing for The Register, concluded that web3 is "a myth, a fairy story. It's what parents tell their kids about at night if they want them to grow up to become economists". That same month, Jack Dorsey, co-founder and former CEO of Twitter, dismissed web3 as a "venture capitalists' plaything". Dorsey opined that web3 will not democratize the internet, but it will shift power from players like Facebook to venture capital funds like Andreessen Horowitz. Also in December 2021, SpaceX and Tesla CEO Elon Musk expressed skepticism about web3 in a tweet, saying that web3 "seems more marketing buzzword than reality right now".

== See also ==
- Distributed social network
- InterPlanetary File System
- History of the World Wide Web
- Decentralized application
- Blockchain
- Cryptocurrency
- Semantic Web
- Fediverse
