= Algorithmic legal order =

Algorithmic legal order may refer to:

- Government by algorithm
- Distributed ledger technology law
