= Ricardian =

Ricardian may refer to:

- A follower of Ricardian economics, named after economist David Ricardo (1772–1823). See also:
  - Ricardian socialism
  - Ricardian contract
  - Ricardian equivalence
  - Neo-Ricardianism
- Ricardian (Richard III), a defender of the reputation of King Richard III of England
