= Tezos =

Decentralized open-source blockchain

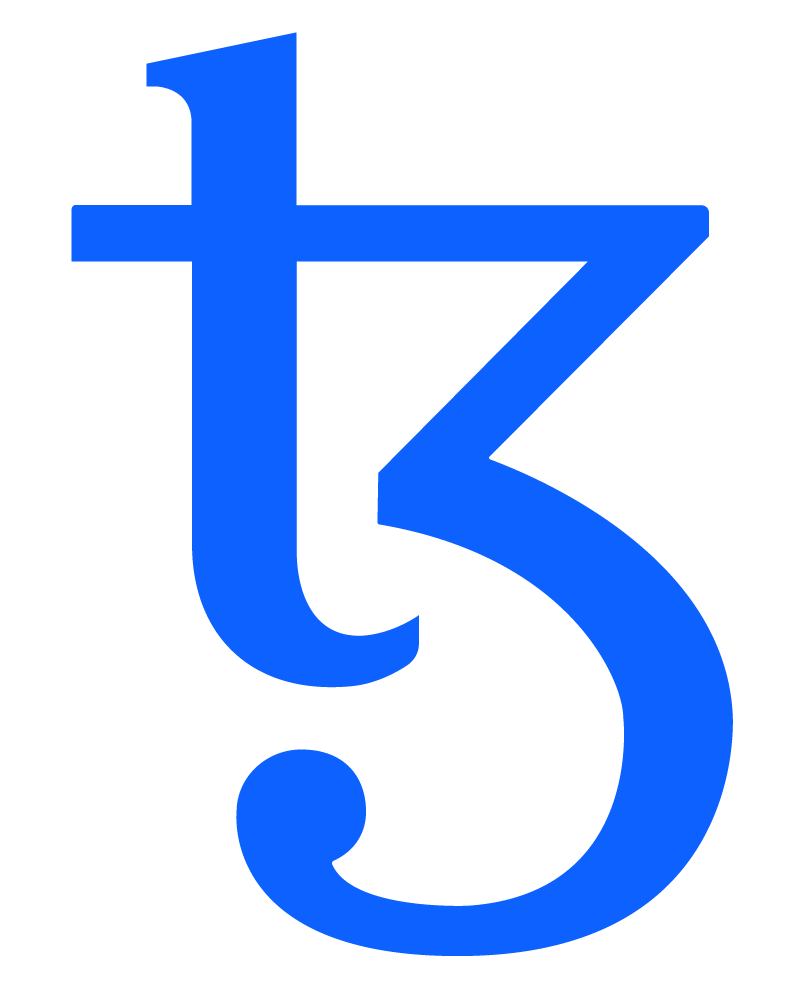

Denominations
- Plural: XTZ, tez
- Symbol: ꜩ
- Code: XTZ
- Subunits
- 1/1000000: Mutez

Development
- Original authors: Arthur Breitman; Kathleen Breitman
- White paper: "Tezos – a self-amending crypto-ledger"
- Initial release: 7.0 / 30 June 2018 (8 years ago)
- Latest release: 20.2 / July 16, 2024
- Code repository: gitlab.com/tezos/tezos
- Development status: Active
- Written in: OCaml
- Source model: Open Source
- License: MIT

Ledger
- Timestamping scheme: Proof-of-stake
- Block reward: ꜩ40
- Block time: 10 seconds (since Paris update)
- Block explorer: tzstats.com tezblock.io tzkt.io
- Circulating supply: ꜩ1,002,937,109 (est. May 2024)

Website
- Website: tezos.com

Tezos is an open-source blockchain that can execute peer-to-peer transactions and serve as a platform for deploying smart contracts. The native cryptocurrency for the Tezos blockchain is the tez (ISO 4217: XTZ; sign: ꜩ). The Tezos network achieves consensus using proof-of-stake. Tezos uses an on-chain governance model that enables the protocol to be amended when upgrade proposals receive a favorable vote from the community. Its testnet was launched in June 2018, and its mainnet went live in September 2018.

== History ==
Tezos was first proposed in 2014 and created by husband-and-wife team Arthur and Kathleen Breitman. While working at Morgan Stanley in 2014, Arthur Breitman released two papers that proposed a new type of blockchain under the pseudonym "L. M. Goodman," referencing a journalist at Newsweek who had misidentified the creator of Bitcoin. He chose the name "Tezos" after writing a program to list unclaimed websites that could be pronounced in English. In 2015, intending to develop Tezos, Arthur Breitman registered a company called Dynamic Ledger Solutions, Inc. (DLS) in Delaware, with himself as chief executive. In March 2014, he contracted French firm OCamlPro to help him conceive the protocol and develop the prototype and the ICO infrastructure. Arthur worked at Morgan Stanley at the time. Still, he did not notify them of his work on Tezos as required by the Financial Industry Regulatory Authority (FINRA), and eventually fined $20,000. He sought to raise $5 to $10 million from banks but could not find backers. By 2016, he left Morgan Stanley, and Tezos received $612,000 from 10 backers while the Breitmans planned for an initial coin offering (ICO).

They received a $1.5 million investment from Tim Draper and hired a public relations firm, Strange Brew to promote their project. The firm was alleged to have falsely claimed that large American financial firms were using Tezos.

=== Tezos Foundation and initial coin offering ===
In 2011, Arthur Breitman first met South African cryptocurrency entrepreneur Johann Gevers through his friend Patri Friedman, the founder of The Seasteading Institute, who had hired Gevers for a project that Breitman had followed closely. From 2014 to 2017, the OCamlPro company was contracted by Arthur Breitman to help him design the first version of the protocol, develop the initial prototype in OCaml, and develop the infrastructure for an initial coin offering (ICO). On April 17, 2017, the Tezos Foundation was established in Zug, Switzerland, by Arthur and Kathleen Breitman, Swiss law firm MME, and Gevers to support an ICO for the Tezos platform. They planned for the foundation to become a non-profit to raise money through the ICO and acquire DLS, which owned the group's technology.

In addition to Switzerland's relatively lax financial oversight and effectively zero corporate tax rate, the benefits for Tezos being in a foundation under the Swiss Civil Code included the ability to treat fundraising transactions as donations and acting as an additional layer of institutional security to protect donations. Gevers became the foundation's first president.

On July 1, 2017, the Tezos Foundation raised $232 million in Bitcoin and Ethereum in one of the biggest initial coin offerings (ICOs). The contributions were termed "non-refundable donations", which Kathleen Breitman likened to a pledge drive where people would receive tote bags, though some participants considered them an investment. It would fall under the Securities and Exchange Commission (SEC) if considered an investment rather than a donation. After the ICO, it was planned that the Tezos Foundation would pay to acquire DLS, and if the Tezos blockchain functioned for at least three months, the Breitmans would receive 8.5% of the ICO and 10% of the tokens.

By October, the Breitmans and Gevers were in a dispute over control of the project, with the Breitmans alleging Gevers pressured the foundation council into signing a contract, giving him a bonus of $1.5 million. Gevers controlled the assets held by the foundation, which stood at $820 million by December, including the Breitmans' share. The disagreements led to delays in the deployment of Tezos, which caused investors to bring lawsuits alleging fraud during the fundraiser and unauthorized sales of securities.

In 2018, Gevers resigned and received $400,000, and the foundation board was replaced. Tezos went live that September.

In 2020, the Tezos founders settled the lawsuits, with the Tezos Foundation paying $25 million before federal courts ruled on whether the ICO was a sale of unregistered securities. Arthur Breitman joined the foundation's council in 2021.

In 2022, The Tezos Foundation launched a £1 million fund to collect NFTs by African and Asian artists to create a digital art gallery to house the collection, curated by British photographer Misan Harriman.

== Design ==
The primary protocol of Tezos utilizes liquid proof of stake (LPoS) and supports Turing-complete smart contracts in a domain-specific language called Michelson. Michelson is a purely functional stack-based language with a reduced instruction set and no side effects, designed with formal verification in mind.

The Tezos protocol allows itself to be amended by a staged process performed by committing operations to the stored blockchain to submit proposals (intended code changes) and to vote on those changes. If a proposal receives enough votes, the protocol will update to incorporate the code changes.

The Tezos blockchain has been used for NFTs as an alternative to more energy-intensive projects such as Ethereum.

== Founders ==
Before working in quantitative finance, Tezos co-founder Arthur Breitman studied applied mathematics, computer science, and physics in France and financial mathematics at New York University under Nassim Nicholas Taleb. Kathleen Breitman (née McCaffrey) studied at Cornell University and worked at a hedge fund and as a consultant. Arthur was the leader of an anarcho-capitalist group in New York, and Kathleen was a libertarian Republican; the two of them met at a crypto-anarchist lunch in 2010 and married in 2013.

== Sponsorship ==
In mid-2021, Tezos signed a sponsorship deal with Red Bull Racing, which ended in December 2022.

In October 2021, Tezos became a sponsor of the New York Mets.

In February 2022, Tezos sponsored Manchester United in a multi-year deal reportedly worth over £20 million annually.

In November 2022, Manchester United issued NFT digital collectibles on the Tezos blockchain.
