= Web 3.0 =

Web 3.0 may refer to:

- Semantic Web, sometimes known as Web 3.0, is an extension of the Web to facilitate data exchange
- Web3, a general idea for a decentralized Internet based on public blockchains
