= Joseph Lubin (entrepreneur) =

Canadian-American blockchain developer (born 1964)

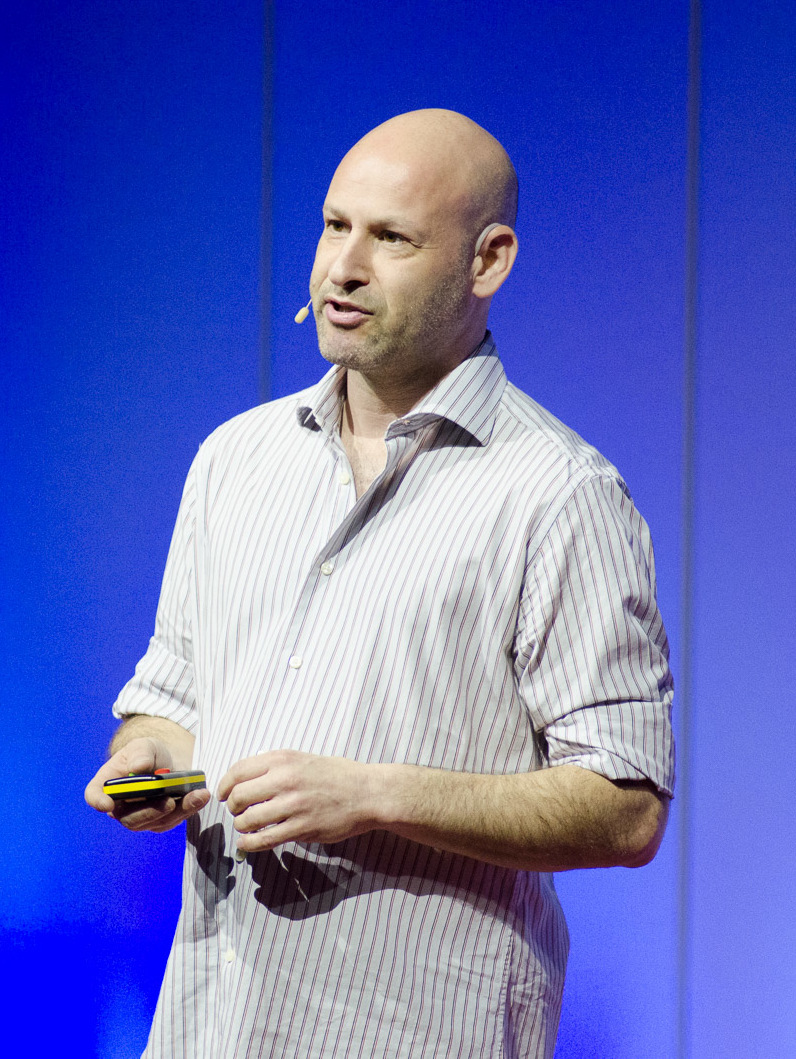
- Joseph Lubin
- Born: 1964 (age 61–62); Toronto, Ontario, Canada
- Education: Princeton University, electrical engineering and computer science
- Known for: distributed database entrepreneur, ConsenSys, Ethereum

Joseph Lubin (born 1964) is a Canadian-American businessman. He has founded and co-founded several companies, including the Swiss-based EthSuisse, contributing heavily to Ethereum, the decentralized cryptocurrency platform. Lubin is the founder of ConsenSys, a Brooklyn-based software production studio.

In February 2018, Forbes estimated Lubin's net worth in cryptocurrency to be between one and five billion dollars.

== Career ==
In early 2014, Lubin was a co-founder of Ethereum and served as chief operating officer of Ethereum Switzerland GmbH (EthSuisse), a company working to extend the capabilities of the type of blockchain technology first popularized by Bitcoin, and extend the capabilities of the blockchain to store programs in addition to data, as well as facilitate, verify, or enforce the negotiation or performance of smart contracts. The new generation of distributed crypto-secure databases with smart contract functionality has been referred to as "Blockchain 2.0".

Lubin was also involved in the creation of the Ethereum Foundation.

He subsequently founded ConsenSys in 2015, a decentralized blockchain production studio. It develops software mainly for the Ethereum blockchain system. It also provides decentralized software services to companies. They also do enterprise and government consulting.

Lubin has been involved in cross-industry groups attempting to advance solutions to governance issues in the blockchain industry.

Lubin graduated from Princeton University with a degree in Electrical Engineering and Computer Science and worked with Goldman Sachs. Lubin's roommate at Princeton was Michael Novogratz.
