= Anthony Di Iorio =

Canadian entrepreneur

- Born: 15th Feb 1975 Toronto, Ontario, Canada
- Education: Ryerson University (now Toronto Metropolitan University)
- Known for: Co-founder of Ethereum

Anthony Di Iorio is a Canadian entrepreneur primarily known as a co-founder of Ethereum and an early investor in Bitcoin. Di Iorio is the founder and CEO of the blockchain company Decentral, and the associated Jaxx wallet. He also was the first chief digital officer of the Toronto Stock Exchange. In February 2018, Forbes estimated his net worth at $750 million–$1 billion.

== Early life ==
Anthony Di Iorio was born in north Toronto, Ontario, Canada, the youngest of three children. He graduated with a marketing degree from Ryerson University (as of 2022, known as Toronto Metropolitan University). Di Iorio developed some websites in the mid-1990s. He would eventually enter the real estate field, investing in residential rentals and becoming a landlord in Toronto.

In 2012, he sold his rental properties to invest in Bitcoin, and began to form companies in the field of cryptocurrency.

== Career ==
Di Iorio began his career working in marketing at a machine manufacturer before he went on to work for his family's patio-door-making business in Woodbridge, Ontario. The family business was sold in 2008, and Di Iorio’s father supported him as he launched a short-lived geothermal drilling company.

He first learned about bitcoin from a podcast called Free Talk Live in 2012. According to The Globe and Mail, he "had an anti-authoritarian streak" and questioned "the fundamentals of mainstream economics." Di Iorio bought his first bitcoin the same day for $9.73. He created the Toronto Bitcoin Meetup Group which held its first meeting at a pub in the same year. As the Meetups grew from about eight attendees to hundreds, Di Iorio formed the Bitcoin Alliance of Canada.

In 2013 Di Iorio founded a Bitcoin wallet Chrome extension called KryptoKit, with Steve Dakh, who created an app for web browsers that allows users to pay for products and services using the cryptocurrency wallet. KryptoKit was later joined by Buterin, Erik Voorhees, and Roger Ver in 2014. In 2014 Di Iorio co-founded the cryptocurrency platform Ethereum, that has been valued at $7 billion and had a market cap of $1.6 billion in 2017.

In 2021, he stated that he intended to leave the crypto market due to "safety concerns."

== TSX, Jaxx, and boards ==
In January 2016, TMX Group hired Di Iorio as the first chief digital officer of the Toronto Stock Exchange (TSX). In February 2016, Di Iorio announced the launch of Jaxx, a unified platform that provides wallet services for both Bitcoin and Ethereum. He left his position at TSX to focus on Jaxx. Di Iorio is the founder and CEO of Decentral Inc, the developer of Jaxx.

Di Iorio has been involved in the development of a rating system for initial coin offerings and attempting to unite various cryptocurrencies into one financial ecosystem. In a series of articles published in February 2018, Forbes named Di Iorio among its list of the top-20 richest people in cryptocurrency.
