= MetaMask =

Software cryptocurrency wallet

- Developer: ConsenSys
- Release: 2016; 10 years ago
- Operating system: iOS; Android
- Platform: Browser extension Mobile app
- Type: Cryptocurrency wallet
- License: Custom proprietary license (since 2020; originally MIT open source)
- Website: metamask.io
- Repository: github.com/MetaMask/metamask-extension

MetaMask is a software cryptocurrency wallet developed by ConsenSys for interacting with the Ethereum blockchain and other EVM-compatible networks. It enables users to manage Ethereum accounts and connect to decentralized applications (dApps) via a browser extension or mobile app.

As of early 2026, MetaMask reports over 100 million users worldwide.

== Overview ==
MetaMask allows users to store and manage private keys, send and receive Ethereum-based cryptocurrencies and tokens (including ERC-20 and ERC-721 standards), broadcast transactions, and interact with dApps. dApps connect to the wallet via JavaScript interfaces, prompting users to approve signatures or transactions.

The wallet features MetaMask Swaps, an in-app token swap aggregator sourcing liquidity from multiple decentralized exchanges (DEXs), with a service fee of 0.875%.

In 2025, MetaMask introduced the MetaMask Rewards program (initially mobile-only), where users earn points for activities such as swaps, bridging, and referrals. Season 1 (October 2025 – January 2026) distributed over $30 million in Linea tokens and other perks to participants.

== History ==
MetaMask launched in 2016 as open-source software under the MIT license. It initially supported browser extensions for Chrome and Firefox. Mobile versions were in closed beta from 2019 and publicly released for iOS and Android in September 2020.

In August 2020, the license changed to a custom proprietary one.

MetaMask Swaps launched on desktop in October 2020 and on mobile in March 2021.

The Rewards program launched in late 2025 with Linea integration.

== Criticism ==
MetaMask has faced criticism over privacy, including default analytics settings that share some user data (which can be disabled).

Its reliance on Infura (acquired by ConsenSys in 2019) has raised concerns about centralization in Ethereum infrastructure.
