= Consensys =

Blockchain software technology company

Consensys Software Inc.
- Type: Corporation
- Industry: Blockchain software
- Founded: October 2014; 12 years ago
- Founders: Joseph Lubin
- Headquarters: Fort Worth, United States
- Number of employees: 500+ (2020)
- Website: consensys.io

Consensys is a private blockchain software technology company founded by Joseph Lubin and based in Fort Worth.

== History ==
Joseph Lubin founded ConsenSys AG in early 2015 as a software foundry to develop decentralized software services and applications that operate on the Ethereum blockchain. On October 31, 2018, ConsenSys acquired Planetary Resources, an asteroid mining company. In December 2018, ConsenSys announced a restructuring with projected layoffs of thirteen percent of its 1,200 staff, and in February 2020 announced the layoffs of a further 14% of staff. In 2020, ConsenSys AG spun out several of its infrastructure projects into a separate company, Consensys Software Inc. (now commonly simply referred to as "Consensys"). ConsenSys AG rebranded as Consensys Mesh the same year. In August 2020, Consensys acquired banking blockchain platform Quorum from JPMorgan Chase & Co. Financial terms of the deal were not disclosed. In November 2021, Consensys raised $200 million at $3.2 billion valuation from Animoca Brands, Coinbase Ventures and HSBC among others. In March 2022, Consensys raised $450 million in a new round led by ParaFi Capital, with Microsoft, SoftBank, and Temasek also joining as new investors in the company. In June 2023, Consensys launched a brand refresh where they introduced a new company narrative, logo, and an updating of the name to remove the camelcase from ConsenSys to Consensys.

== Projects ==
Consensys is involved in many different projects and services for blockchain uses and applications.

MetaMask is an Ethereum wallet application which allows users to store and transfer cryptocurrencies and tokens, as well as access and interact with decentralized applications built on the Ethereum blockchain. The software was originally MIT-licensed as open source on desktops as a browser extension, but was relicensed in 2020 under a custom proprietary license. It can also be used through a proprietary mobile app.

Infura is a blockchain node infrastructure service that allows apps and developers to get data from, and broadcast transactions to, the Ethereum blockchain. Infura's network is used as a backend for Ethereum services and applications, including MetaMask and many others not associated with Consensys.

The company has started or invested in several different projects that are not considered to be core to their business, have been spun out into more independent entities, or are not wholly owned by Consensys. Some of these include Meridio, a platform used to create, manage, and trade fractional-share ownership in real estate assets, and Gnosis Safe, a platform for managing digital assets securely on ethereum.

== ICOs ==
Civil Media, a Consensys-backed company that claims to use cryptocurrency to save journalism sold CVL tokens to the public in an ICO in October 2018. Civil was able to raise $1.8 million, less than the $8 million soft cap.

It was later revealed that Consensys was the largest buyer of CVL tokens, buying 80% of the CVL tokens that went on sale.

== Controversies ==
Consensys has been involved in multiple controversies and lawsuits. These include a High Court challenge in Ireland against the ruling of the Workplace Relations Commission. Separately, the 2020 sale of MetaMask and other assets from its Swiss parent company to its US entity has been litigated over alleged irregularities in corporate governance. On June 28, 2024 the US Securities and Exchange Commission announced that they had charged Consensys with engaging in the unregistered offer and sale of securities through MetaMask Staking, and operating as an unregistered broker through MetaMask Staking and MetaMask Swaps. In an attempt to preempt the SEC's suit, on April 25, 2024 Consensys had sued the SEC and its commissioners in the Northern District of Texas asking the court to declare that MetaMask Swaps does not make Consensys a broker-dealer; MetaMask Staking is not an offering of securities; and that Ether (ETH), the native token of the Ethereum blockchain, is not a security.
