= JPM Coin =

Cryptocurrency issued by JPMorgan Chase

JPM Coin is a dollar-backed cryptocurrency (stablecoin) from the bank JPMorgan Chase, announced in February 2019 as an institution-to-institution service.

JPM Coin is intended to serve as a value token on the Quorum consortium blockchain, using software (called "Quorum") also built by JPMorgan Chase, and is used to facilitate interbank payments on the Interbank Information Network (IIN).

As of October 2023, JPM Coin is used for approximately $1 billion of transactions each day.

In November of 2024, Onyx and the JPM Coin were rebranded by JPMorgan Kinexys and Kinexys Digital Payments.
