= ERC-721 =

Technical standard for NFTs

- ERC-721: Non-Fungible Token Standard
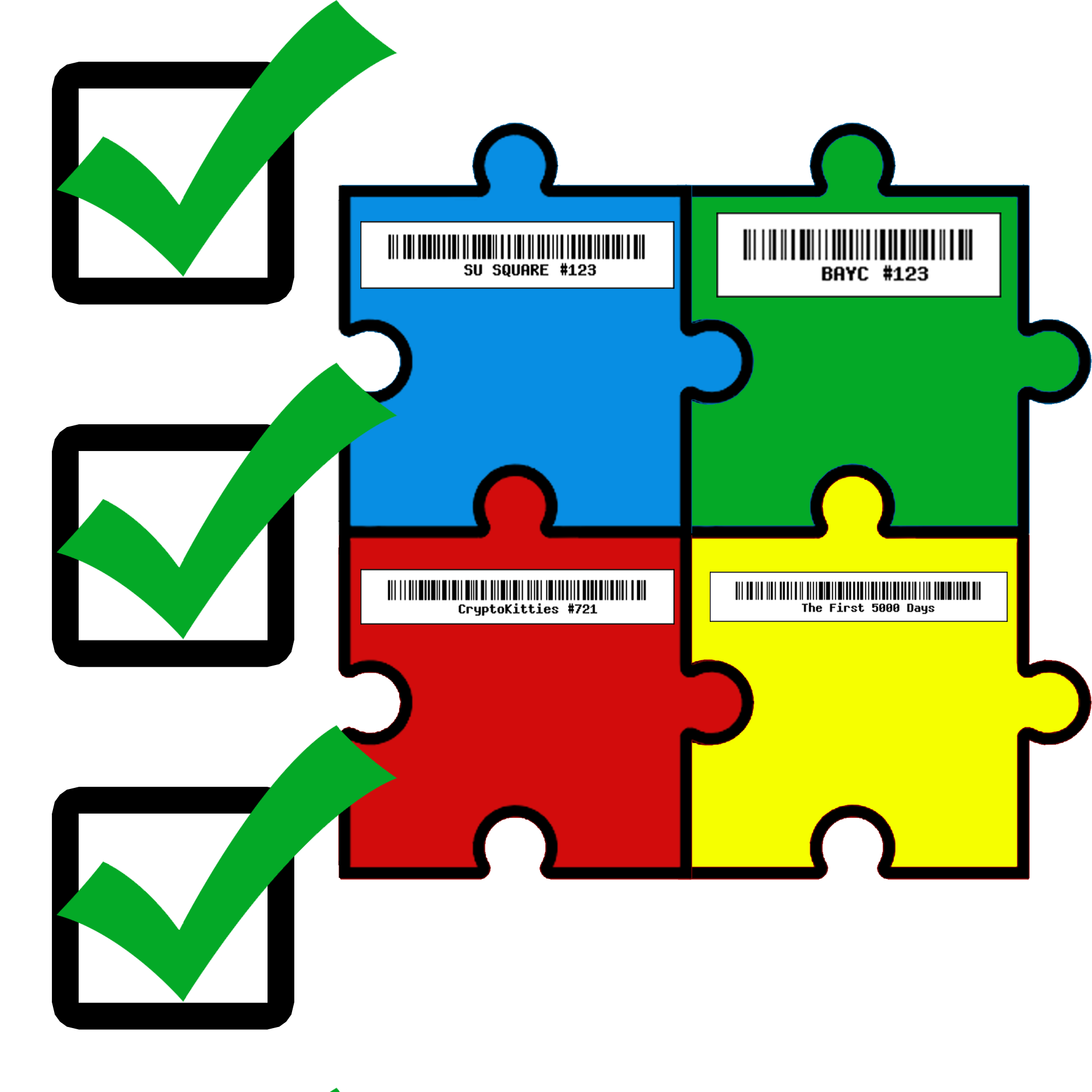
- ERC-721 illustrated with checkmarks and puzzle pieces representing standardized properties, compatibility and non-fungibility
- Year started: 2017
- First published: 2018
- Series: Ethereum Improvement Proposals (EIP)
- Authors: William Entriken, Dieter Shirley, Jacob Evans, Nastassia Sachs
- Predecessor: ERC-20
- Domain: NFTs
- Copyright: Creative Commons CC0
- Website: eips.ethereum.org/EIPS/eip-721

The ERC-721 Non-fungible Token Standard is a technical framework, defining a set of rules and interfaces for creating and managing unique, non-fungible tokens (NFTs) on the Ethereum blockchain. ERC-721 is recognized for formalizing the concept of an NFT and establishing the foundation of the multi-billion dollar digital collectibles ecosystem that emerged alongside its adoption. It is one of the most widely used NFT standards across use cases and has been utilized in various high profile projects.

The development of the standard was a community-driven effort that was formally published into a paper of the same name in 2018 and is accredited to William Entriken and co-authors Dieter Shirley, Jacob Evans, and Nastassia Sachs. ERC stands for "Ethereum Request for Comments," and is a part of the Ethereum community's peer-review process in which new proposals are considered for publication; the "721" is a unique identifier, each proposal is assigned one arbitrarily after an editor approves it in the draft phase. The blockchain game featuring digital cat artworks known as CryptoKitties is credited with pioneering ERC-721 when it achieved mainstream attention shortly after its launch in 2017.

== History ==
=== Digital collectibles prior to ERC-721 ===
The concept of non-fungible digital assets that could be owned on a blockchain predated ERC-721, with projects like Colored Coins on Bitcoin in 2012. In 2017, just prior to ERC-721’s publication, Larva Labs launched the CryptoPunks NFT project on Ethereum using ERC-20 (a fungible token standard). CryptoPunks served as a direct inspiration for ERC-721’s initial drafting.

=== Formalizing the term "NFT" ===
The term "non-fungible token" (NFT) is not known to have been used to refer to NFT projects prior to ERC-721. ERC-721: Non-Fungible Token Standard is credited with formalizing and defining the term NFT.

During the standard's drafting phase, lead author Entriken held a vote among the stakeholders where different words were considered including deed, title and asset, but ultimately "NFT" was chosen for the standard's final publication.

Use of the term's popularity grew through CryptoKitties, the blockchain game featuring digital cats NFT utilizing ERC-721.

=== Initial adoption ===
==== CryptoKitties ====
The blockchain game CryptoKitties by Dapper Labs of which the CTO Dieter Shirley is a fellow co-author of ERC-721, is recognized as the earliest pioneering and popular instance of the ERC-721 standard. It utilized an early version of ERC-721 that was not fully compliant with the standard published in 2018. CryptoKitties is regarded as among the first NFT applications to achieve widespread adoption, earning millions of dollars initially and taking up to 70% of Ethereum's usage capacity at its height in some moments.

==== Su Squares ====
Launched in 2018 by Entriken and inspired by the Million Dollar Homepage, this NFT project is the first fully compliant demonstration of the ERC-721 NFT standard.

==== NFT marketplaces ====
In 2017, one of the earliest and most successful NFT marketplaces, OpenSea, was launched by co-founders Alex Atallah and Devin Finzer who intended to capitalize off of the emergence of ERC-721 NFTs on Ethereum. They initially focused on capturing the market activity around the blockchain NFT game CryptoKitties, which was one of the first use cases of ERC-721, and ultimately planned to scale the platform for other emerging projects utilizing it.

With the introduction of ERC-721, it felt like such an idea was possible for the first time.

— David Finzer, How one company took over the NFT trade – The Verge

The NFT marketplace SuperRare also emerged in 2018 to enable trading of tokens of this standard.

== Notable functionality ==
=== Custom metadata ===
ERC-721 implementation requires "name" and "symbol" identifiers, and the token is assigned a contract address upon deployment to the blockchain. Also, a mechanism to implement a URI (Uniform Resource Identifier) to the contract, is defined in the standard, providing functionality to assign each NFT unique metadata.

Though not required, most NFTs implementing ERC-721 will also implement the OpenSea Metadata Standard.

=== Trackable ownership ===
Trackable ownership is the key feature which adds non-fungibility to the ERC-721 standard. Each NFT is assigned a token identification number, and linked to its owner through the "ownerOf" function. Through the optional "ERC-721 Enumerable" extension, functionality for full ownership tracking is implemented. This differs from the ERC-20 token standard, which only tracks an owners token balance though ERC-721 also tracks it as well.

=== Security ===
The ERC-721 standard defines both safe and unsafe transfer functions, offering different levels of security for various implementations. These functions allow transfers initiated by the token owner, or an approved operator of their individual tokens. Further, developers can implement custom logic to these transfer functions, providing the functionality for NFT protocols to operate. For example, marketplaces like OpenSea, make use of approved operators to facilitate the sale of NFTs.

== Influence of work ==
The influence of the paper ERC-721: Non-Fungible Token Standard that Entriken lead authorship of spans across various sectors, shaping the landscape of digital collectibles and the use cases within the broader NFT eco-system.

ERC-721 was awarded rank #1 in ArtReview's Power 100 in 2021 indicating it as "the most powerful art entity in the world" and being the first non-human entity to be ranked as such.

== Derivative standards ==
Several months after ERC-721: Non-Fungible Token Standard was published, a semi-fungible token standard was introduced, called ERC-1155, that was intended to expand on the functionality and flexibility of ERC-721's purpose.

The same ERC-721 standard is utilized on the Polygon blockchain.

Other standards have proposed extensions or alternatives to ERC-721 for specific NFT use cases. ERC-7160, finalized in 2023, extends ERC-721 metadata by allowing multiple metadata URIs per token."ERC-7160: ERC-721 Multi-Metadata Extension". Ethereum Improvement Proposals. 9 June 2023. ERC-725 defines generic data storage and execution interfaces that can be used to enhance NFT and token metadata."ERC-725: General data key/value store and execution". Ethereum Improvement Proposals. 2 October 2017. LUKSO's LSP8 Identifiable Digital Asset standard is described by its documentation as an NFT standard based on ERC-721 and ERC-1155 that adds features such as bytes32 token identifiers, metadata through LSP4, token transfer hooks, and an optional force parameter for transfers."LSP8 - Identifiable Digital Asset". LUKSO Tech Documentation.

== Criticisms ==
The basic version of the ERC-721 standard, as published in ERC-721: Non-Fungible Token Standard, has been criticized by Omar et al for offering limited functionality for the execution of smart contracts associated with NFTs.

Certain NFT use cases demand some features that are not offered by the standard ERC721 and must be created and arranged; such features include the following options: token creation, token deletion, contract access control, and others.

— Ali et al, A review of the key challenges of non-fungible tokens,

Arcenegui et al. points out possible deficits regarding the user in the ERC-721 basic smart contracts and proposes properties to improve and expand its functionality.

== See also ==
- Deed
- Digital art
