= Sherman3D =

Malaysian video game studio

- Type: Privately held company
- Industry: Video games
- Founded: 2003
- Headquarters: Malaysia
- Products: Alpha Kimori (PC)
- Website: www.Sherman3D.com

Sherman3D is an independently owned video game developer team founded by Sherman Chin in April 2003, which develops anime-inspired video games.

== Overview ==
Sherman3D started as an independent game development community but was incorporated in April 2003 in Malaysia. Sherman3D's has online developers from countries such as Japan, New Zealand, United Kingdom and the United States. Sherman3D has worked on over 20 games including Drawn To Life published by THQ in 2007, Scribblenauts published by Warner Bros. Interactive Entertainment in 2009, Nickelodeon Diego's Build & Rescue published by 2K Play in 2010.

In 2011, Sherman3D created its own story and trademarked intellectual property in the form of a sci-fi fantasy PC Role Playing Game entitled Alpha Kimori Great Doubt Episode One, which was distributed by Big Fish Games, IGN Entertainment and GameHouse in the US, IGN in the UK, GamersGate in Sweden, and DLsite in Japan.

Sherman3D is an authorized Nintendo DS developer and provides pixel art partner studio outsourcing services to other game development companies such as 5th Cell. Sherman3D and its services is also listed in the Game Developer's Market Guide book

== History ==
Sherman3D worked on a MMORPG prototype entitled Vibeforce on IBM's Butterfly Supercomputing Grid for Sony's PlayStation 2, which was showcased at E3 2003. Sherman3D was mentioned in The New York Times, The Wall Street Journal and USA Today.

The Sherman3D 3D BSP Game Engine and documentation has been used as university research paper reference.

Sherman3D also worked on all the in-game pixel art graphics of Scribblenauts, Lock's Quest and Drawn To Life, which were rated at 8.5, 8.5 and 8.0 out of 10 respectively by IGN Entertainment.

Sherman3D's Alpha Kimori game was selected as the first and only commercial flagship RPG Maker game sold by Degica Co., Ltd., Japan, the official sole distributor of the RPG Maker game engine internationally on 5 August 2012.

Sherman3D showcased Alpha Kimori at the Tokyo Game Show in Japan on 20 and 21 September 2012 and was highlighted by the Japanese media as a tribute to classic Japanese role-playing games.

Sherman3D's Alpha Kimori was put up on Valve's Steam Greenlight and was featured on Tech In Asia and Gamezebo.

The following is a chronology of Alpha Kimori event on Valve's Steam platform:

- 2013 May 21 | Alpha Kimori JRPG and Philosophy lecture by Sherman Chin at Casual Connect Asia in Singapore at the Tower Ballroom of Shangri-la Hotel.
- 2013 December 9 | Alpha Kimori GreenLit on Steam.
- 2014 March 17 | Alpha Kimori launches on Valve's Steam after being Greenlit.
- 2014 April 1 | Alpha Kimori launches on Big Fish Games Japan.
- 2014 June 17 | Alpha Kimori sold over 29,000 copies in the Groupees Be Mine 13 Game and Charity Bundle sponsored by Machinima.
- 2014 December 25 | Alpha Kimori sold 31,657 copies in the Humble Weekly Bundle: RPG Edition Book 1 Bundle.

== Sherman Chin ==
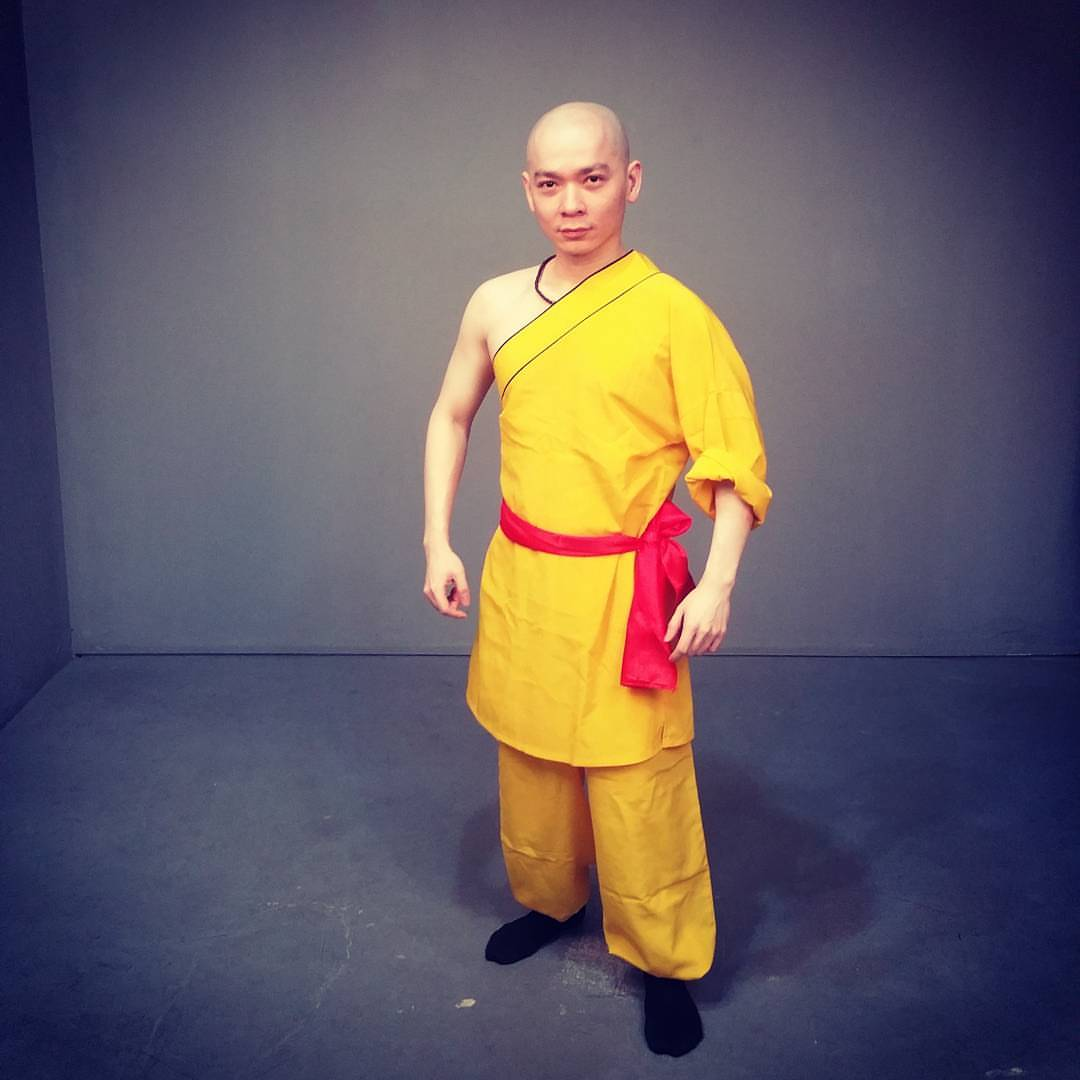
Sherman Chin

Sherman Chin is the founder of Sherman3D. Sherman graduated with a BSc (Hons) in Computing from the University of Portsmouth, UK, and was the recipient of the 2002 International Game Developers Association scholarship.

Sherman was awarded his first startup fund via Venture 2002, Malaysia's first nationwide business plan competition organized by McKinsey & Company and presented by Malaysia's Prime Minister Abdullah Ahmad Badawi.

Sherman became a partner of the founder of 5th Cell, Joseph Tringali, at Epix Interactive Studios before being a founding a shareholder of 5th Cell.

Sherman worked as a game producer in Japan, as a project manager in Canada, as a COO in Malaysia and a game industry consultant for the Gerson Lehrman Group providing advisory services for international investors.

Sherman was appointed by Limkokwing University of Creative Technology and Universiti Tunku Abdul Rahman as their external examiner for their games design courses

Sherman was the creator and game producer of Alpha Kimori, the first Malaysian game greenlit on Steam. He was interviewed by RPGamer, GameRamble, and the Astro Awani satellite TV news channel. He was also featured on the cover and center spread of the New Straits Times newspapers' Tech pullout.

Sherman first spoke on the philosophy of Great Doubt in Alpha Kimori at the Defense, Science & Research Conference 2011 organized by the National University of Singapore in Singapore in August 2011.

Sherman also spoke on the philosophy of Great Doubt at Casual Connect Asia in Singapore and was featured by the official Casual Connect GameSauce website. Sherman was selected by the Tokyo Game Show management committee to represent Malaysia at the indie game area of Tokyo Game Show on the 17, 18, 19 and 20 September 2015, sponsored by Sony PlayStation.

Sherman was one of the main speakers at the Cloud South East Asia conference on 7 October 2015 covering PC Game and Cloud Computing organized by Informa PLC, London and was interviewed by Business Cloud News.

Sherman was the featured speakers at the Mobile Developer Day 2015 Conference on 22 October 2015 covering the 1337 Game Accelerator in Cyberjaya, Malaysia.

Sherman spoke about the 1337 Ventures game pre-accelerator at the closed door CIO Asia Summit organized by GDS International attended by 30 international CIOs from 27 until 29 October 2015 at the Le Meridien Hotel, Kuala Lumpur.

In late 2016, Sherman was credited to be Malaysia's most experienced video game developer.

In 2023, Sherman's Alpha Kimori was showcased as one of the Steam games in Malaysia.

In 2024, Sherman was the featured speaker on Gaming, Esports and Blockchain for the Blockchain Marketing Boutique together with Kanyarat Saengsawang, Thailand Head Of Growth for The Sandbox (2012 video game). Sherman's title was listed as Chief Strategy Officer of the game, Tales of Aleko.

== Original Intellectual Property Titles ==
- 2011 | Alpha Kimori (PC) - Published and Distributed by Big Fish Games, GameHouse, GameFly, RealArcade Japan, Direct2Drive UK, Direct2Drive US, GamersGate Sweden, DLsite Japan, GameFools, About.com, AT&T, AOL Games.com, I-Play, iWin, MSN, Shockwave, MumboJumbo, Encyclopædia Britannica, Asus, EA's Pogo.com, Yahoo, Virgin Media, Paltalk, Oberon
- 2012 | Alpha Kimori 2 (PC) - Published by Sherman3D
- 2014 | RPG Maker VX Ace - Royal Tiles Resource Pack (PC) - Distributed by Steam
- 2014 | RPG Maker VX Ace - Dungeons and Volcanoes Tile Pack (PC) - Distributed by Steam
- 2014 | RPG Maker VX Ace - Wild West Tiles Pack (PC) - Distributed by Steam
- 2014 | RPG Maker VX Ace - Evil Castle Tiles Pack (PC) - Distributed by Steam
- 2014 | RPG Maker VX Ace - Halloween Tiles Resource Pack (PC) - Distributed by Steam
- 2015 | RPG Maker VX Ace - Sci-Fi Tiles (PC) - Distributed by Steam
- 2015 | RPG Maker VX Ace - Winter Wonderland Tiles (PC) - Distributed by Steam
- 2015 | RPG Maker VX Ace - Valentine's Tile Pack (PC) - Distributed by Steam
- 2016 | RPG Maker VX Ace - Casino Tile Pack (PC) - Distributed by Steam
- 2016 | RPG Maker VX Ace - Classic School Tiles (PC) - Distributed by Steam
- 2016 | RPG Maker MV - Town of Seasons (PC) - Distributed by Steam
- 2017 | RPG Maker MV - Modern Urban Tileset (PC) - Distributed by Steam
- 2017 | RPG Maker MV - Steampunk Tiles MV (PC) - Distributed by Steam
- 2017 | RPG Maker VX Ace - Pirate Ship Tiles (PC) - Distributed by Steam
- 2017 | RPG Maker VX Ace - Futuristic School Tiles (PC) - Distributed by Steam
- 2018 | RPG Maker MV - Wonderland Forest Tileset (PC) - Distributed by Steam
- 2018 | RPG Maker MV - Haunted School Tiles (PC) - Distributed by Steam
- 2018 | RPG Maker MV - Wizard Castle Inner Tiles (PC) - Distributed by Steam
- 2018 | RPG Maker MV - Steampunk Town Tiles (PC) - Distributed by Steam
- 2018 | RPG Maker MV - Town of Seasons - Interiors (PC) - Distributed by Steam
- 2018 | RPG Maker MV - Valentine Tile Pack for MV (PC) - Distributed by Steam
- 2019 | RPG Maker MV - Winter Tiles (PC) - Distributed by Steam
- 2020 | RPG Maker MV - Crime City Tiles (PC) - Distributed by DLsite
- 2020 | Sherman3D: Crime City Tiles for RPG Maker MV (PC) - Distributed by Itch.io
- 2020 | Sherman3D: Steampunk Arena Tiles for RPG Maker (PC) - Distributed by Itch.io
- 2020 | Sherman3D: Modern Urban Tiles for RPG Maker (PC) - Distributed by Itch.io

== Partner Intellectual Property Titles ==
- 2003 | In-game art for SEAL Team 6 (Mobile) - Published by THQ Wireless
- 2003 | In-game art for Siege (Mobile) - Published by THQ Wireless
- 2003 | In-game art for Mini Poccha (Mobile) - Published by THQ Wireless
- 2004 | In-game art for Lemony Snicket's A Series of Unfortunate Events (Mobile) - Published by EA Mobile
- 2005 | In-game art for Darts Pro! (Mobile) - Published by THQ Wireless
- 2005 | Game Port Programming for Ministry of Sound: Club Manager (Mobile) - Published by THQ Wireless
- 2006 | Game Port Programming for Moto GP Manager (Mobile) - Published by THQ Wireless
- 2006 | Game Port Programming for Full Spectrum Warrior: Mobile (Mobile) - Published by THQ Wireless
- 2006 | In-game art for D.N.A. (PC) - Published by Merscom
- 2007 | In-game art for Drawn to Life (DS) - Published by THQ
- 2007 | In-game art for Aveyond 2 (PC) - Published by Big Fish Games
- 2008 | In-game art for Lock's Quest (DS) - Published by THQ
- 2008 | In-game art for Majestic Forest (PC) - Published by IGN Entertainment
- 2009 | In-game art for Drawn to Life: The Next Chapter (DS) - Published by THQ
- 2009 | In-game art for Scribblenauts (DS) - Published by Warner Bros. Interactive Entertainment
- 2009 | Chat Code Programming for Tradewars Rising (PC) - Published by Sylien Games
- 2009 | In-game art for Aveyond 3 (PC) - Published by Big Fish Games
- 2010 | In-game art for Nickelodeon Diego's Build & Rescue (DS) - Published by 2K Play
- 2011 | In-game art for Good Luck Charlie: Bug Be Gone (PC) - Published by Disney
- 2011 | In-game art for Zeke and Luther: Trick Challenge 2 (PC) - Published by Disney
- 2011 | In-game art for DaGeDar (DS) - Published by GameMill Entertainment
- 2011 | In-game art for Moshi Monsters Moshling Zoo (DS) - Published by Activision
- 2021 | Lepricat Non-fungible token - Published by OpenSea
