= Pretty Pet Salon =

2011 video game

- Developer: Dream Cortex
- Publisher: Animoca
- Platforms: iOS, Android
- Release: January 26, 2011 (iOS); May 13, 2011 (Android)
- Genres: Casual; Strategy; Simulation
- Mode: Single player

Pretty Pet Salon is a strategy video game developed by Hong Kong studio Dream Cortex and published by Animoca The game was released on January 26, 2011 for iOS and on May 13, 2011 for Android devices. An HD version was released for the iPad on February 26, 2011, followed by an Android version on May 13, 2011. The iOS versions were taken down for a time on January 15, 2012 but since then the franchise has reappeared on Apple's App Store. Pretty Pet Salon on the Android Market and on the Amazon Appstore were unaffected.

In the game, players must run a pet-grooming salon by micro-managing their staff. Pets must be groomed correctly to maintain customer satisfaction and the salon's profit.

The game is a freemium application, and it is the first title in the "Pretty Pet" series of apps. The game was downloaded 11 million times within its first 6 months of release.

== Gameplay ==
The game is set in a virtual grooming salon presented in a fixed, third person, one-point perspective view. The player has a full view of the entire salon at all times, where service stations are affixed. The objective of the game is to increase the salon's level.

Each game day lasts for approximately 2.5 minutes, during which a number of customers will automatically enter the salon with their pets. Upon entering, an icon will appear on top of each customer's pet to indicate which service they require. The player must then drag the pet to the appropriate station, after which an exclamation mark icon will appear on top of the pet. At that point, the player must tap on the pet in order for their staff to attend to it, and only afterward will the service be completed. Each pet may require more than one service per visit. Customers and their pets have a limited amount of patience, which serves as a time limit for each service. If pets are not served within the time limit, the owner along with their pet will leave the salon without payment.

Once all services for the pet are completed, the customer and their pet will move on to the cashier to pay. Players must then tap on the cashier in order for their staff to collect payment. For each customer that successfully completes payment, the player will gain a certain amount of "happiness" and in-game currency. Levels are earned by achieving a certain amount of "happiness" and accumulating a certain amount of in-game currency. Requirements for the next level will be displayed at the end of each game day. As the salon gains levels, the game will also increase in difficulty.

At the end of each game day, players are also given the option to upgrade or purchase more stations, and upgrade or hire more staff. Purchases can be made using purchasable currency, called "Pet Points," or using the free in-game currency earned through regular game play.

== Reception ==
As of November 14, 2011, Pretty Pet Salon has received a user rating of 4.1 out of 5 stars on the Android Market based on 25,053 votes. On the iTunes US App Store, the game earned a user rating of 3 out of 5 stars for all versions of the game on the US App Store (iOS) based on 20,058 votes.

On February 11, 2011, Pretty Pet Salon reached #6 on the global Top iPhone Games chart and #11 on the global Top Apps chart, both based on number of downloads.
