= Animoca Brands =

Video game company

Animoca Brands Corporation Ltd
- Type: Limited company
- Industry: Video games, venture capital, blockchain
- Founders: Yat Siu, David Kim
- Headquarters: Cyberport, Telegraph Bay, Hong Kong
- Key people: Yat Siu (Co-Founder and Executive Chairman), Evan Auyang (President), Robby Yung (CEO)
- Products: The Sandbox, Power Rangers: Battle for the Grid, Projection: First Light, Crazy Defense Heroes, REVV Motorsport, Arc8, Phantom Galaxies, Life Beyond, Benji Bananas, Mocaverse
- Revenue: 573 M (Jan-April 2022)
- Subsidiaries: The Sandbox, Blowfish Studios, Quidd, GAMEE, nWay, Pixowl, Forj, Lympo, Animoca Brands Japan, Grease Monkey Games, Eden Games, Darewise Entertainment, Notre Game, TinyTap, Be Media, PIXELYNX, WePlay Media
- Website: www.animocabrands.com

Animoca Brands Corporation Ltd is a Hong Kong-based game software company and venture capital company co-founded in 2014 by Yat Siu and David Kim.

It was listed on the Australian Securities Exchange from 23 January 2015 to 9 March 2020.

== Notable properties ==
Games owned by the company include:

- Power Rangers: Legacy Wars, Power Rangers: Battle for the Grid
- Projection: First Light

Animoca Brands has also licensed games and applications for: The Addams Family, Atari, Care Bears, Fan Controlled Football, Formula E, Manchester City FC, MotoGP, Snoop Dogg, Wonder Park, and the WWE. Former licenses include Formula One.

Animoca Brands' has over 390 cryptocurrency as well as non-crypto-related holdings, this include Axie Infinity, OpenSea, Dapper Labs, Colossal Biosciences, MoviePass and CryptoKitties.

== History ==
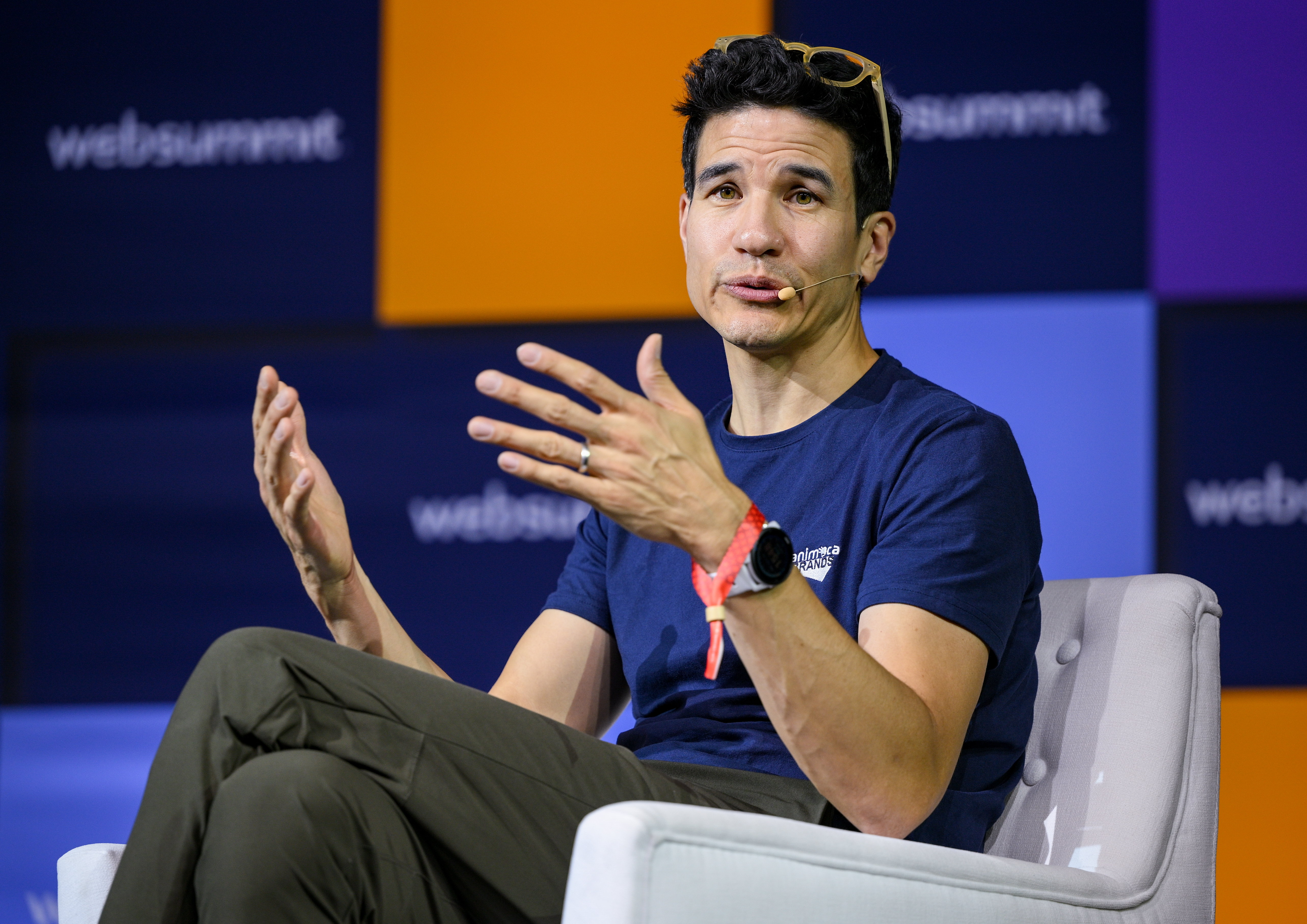
Robby Yung, CEO of Animoca Brands

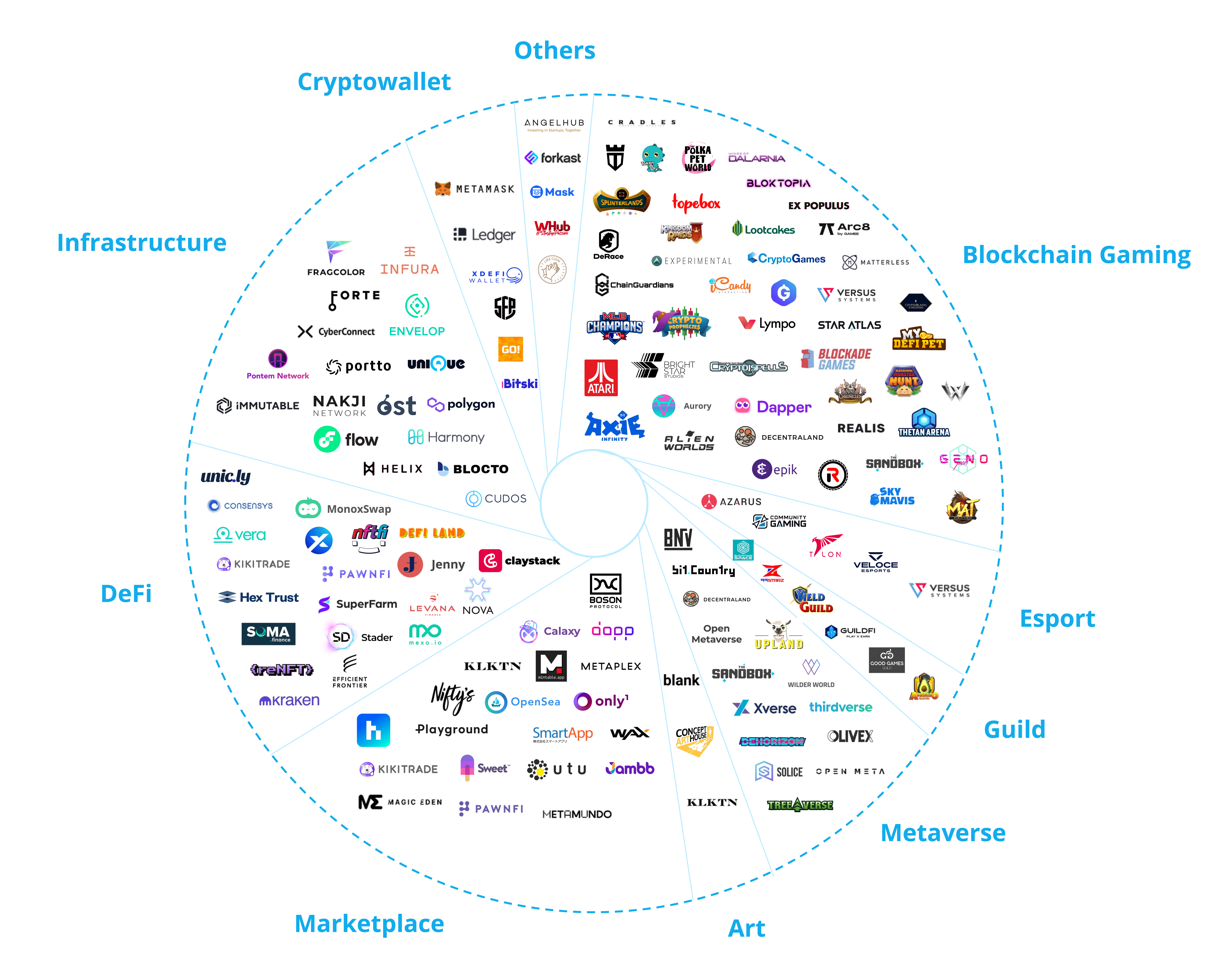
Investments

On November 15, 2011, mobile games developer Animoca raised an undisclosed amount of funding in a Series A round led by Intel Capital and IDG-Accel (which tapped its China Growth Fund III). In 2014 Animoca Brands was spun out from Animoca, and the new entity listed on the Australian Securities Exchange in January 2015.

In March 2018, Animoca Brands launched OliveX which builds mobile games to gamify the fitness industry.

On 15 August 2018, Animoca Brands raised a $1 million investment from Sun Hung Kai and $0.5 million from strategic partner Lympo. On 18 December 2018, Animoca Brands announced that it had completed a US$547,000 placement to institutional and sophisticated investors, a portion of which would be applied towards funding its investment in artificial intelligence accelerator Zeroth.ai.

In May 2019, Animoca Brands raised $2.5 million to fund the development of a blockchain version of the video game The Sandbox based on user-generated content. Then, in March 2019, Animoca Brands raised another $2.01 million in cash and cryptocurrency for The Sandbox from investors that included Square Enix, B Cryptos, and True Global Ventures.

On 9 March 2020, Animoca Brands delisted from the Australian Securities Exchange.

In September 2020 Animoca Brands launched the blockchain racing ERC-20 utility token "REVV" on Uniswap, which was subsequently listed on various other exchanges.

In May 2021 Animoca Brands raised a first tranche of US$88,888,888 followed in July 2021 by the second tranche of US$50 million, both of which were based on valuation of US$1 billion. In October 2021 Animoca Brands raised $65 million at a valuation of $2.2 billion from Ubisoft, Sequoia Capital and others. In November 2021 SoftBank led a $93 million investment in Animoca Brands' The Sandbox.

In December 2021, Binance and Animoca Brands launched a $200 million investment program to offer funding for blockchain games.

On March 15, 2022, Animoca Brands announced it would shut down the F1 Delta Time game the next day. The game had previously been lucrative, holding the record for most expensive NFT of 2019 and with some transactions exceeding US$300,000. Sales within the game had flat-lined for the two years preceding the game's closure. The company announced plans to replace the game's non-functional NFTs with equivalent tokens for REVV Racing, a separate game which doesn't have Formula 1 branding.

In April 2022, Animoca Brands acquired the Lyon-based video game developer, Eden Games.

On 21 June 2022 Animoca Brands Corporation Limited was convicted on charges of failing to lodge annual and half-yearly financial reports with the Australian Securities and Investments Commission.

In July 2022, Animoca Brands hits $5.9 billion valuation. In August 2022 Temasek with GGV Capital lead a $110 million funding round for Animoca Brands at a $6 billion valuation to make it “pre-IPO ready”. In December 2022, Animoca Brands acquired a majority stake in the music metaverse platform, Pixelynx. Pixelynx was founded in 2020 by two electronic music producers, Deadmau5 and Richie Hawtin.
