= Legends of Aria =

Indie MMORPG

Legends of Aria (Shards Online)
- Developers: Citadel Studios Inc. & Reaper Games
- Publishers: Citadel Studios Inc. & Reaper Games
- Platform: Microsoft Windows
- Release: July 2020
- Genre: MMORPG
- Mode: Multiplayer

Legends of Aria or LoA (formerly Shards Online) is a fantasy-based indie MMORPG. The game was released in beta in 2014, early-access in 2019, and a full release in 2020. It was developed by Citadel Studios Inc., a gaming company founded by Derek Brinkmann, who previously lead development of Ultima Online. In 2022, the game announced plans to shift to a blockchain game, with the introduction of a cryptocurrency and NFTs.

== Gameplay ==
The game is available in English and is free-to-play with options to buy "Packages," such as the Citizen Pack that allows building houses, shops, and gives extra bank slots in the game. LoA is based on a 3D isometric view.

There are limited tutorials and missions in the game. The story is not predetermined, and the players can develop different skills at a limit of 600 points. There are many ways to play the game, including full-loot player versus player combat.

== Development ==
Legends of Aria was developed in eight years by Citadel Studios, which was led by Derek Brinkmann, the lead developer of Ultima Online. In February 2019, an in-game store was added.

Originally named Shards Online, the game's early-access version was launched in August 2019. The release-version was launched almost a year later, in July 2020. The first DLC was released in March 2021. The game was formerly launched from a Kickstarter campaign and originally named Shards Online.

In 2021, Justin Olivetti writing for Massively Overpowered said "It's no secret that Citadel Studio’s Kickstarted Legends of Aria has wallowed in near-niche obscurity since its summer 2020 launch." In addition to licensing-out the game's Shard engine to another game, CODEX, the company announced plans to update the engine and add several new features.

On February 23, 2022, the game posted on its official Twitter account that Legends of Aria was soon to integrate blockchain in its system, making the game a free-to-play and play-to-earn MMO. It will use ARIA Tokens as a cryptocurrency and game characters as NFTs. The game's whitepaper describes an overhaul of the game, with plans for improved graphics, a new camera angle, and new content such as boats, in-game poker, and a new world. This relaunch of the game is to be published and owned by Reaper Games, a joint-venture between the founder of Citadel Studios and cryptocurrency entrepreneur Joseph Rubin.

On April 18, 2024, Citadel Studios announced Legends of Aria Classic, a version of the game in the state as it was in 2019, releasing in May 9, 2024 on Steam with a subscription model and a 30-day trial.

== Reception ==
PC Gamer called it Ultima Online's "spiritual successor".

The game won the "Best Indie MMO" award at Pax East in 2014 and 2017.
