= Sayonara o Oshiete ~Comment te Dire Adieu~ =

2001 video game

- Developer: CRAFTWORK
- Publishers: CRAFTWORK & Asoberu! BD-GAME
- Director: Nagaoka Kenzo
- Artist: Nagaoka Kenzo
- Writers: Ishino Michiho; Nagaoka Kenzo
- Composers: I've; Sapporo Momoko
- Platform: Windows 95/98/2000/Me
- Release: March 2, 2001
- Genre: Visual novel
- Mode: Single-player

Sayonara o Oshiete ~Comment te Dire Adieu~ (Japanese: さよならを教えて～comment te dire adieu～), often abbreviated as Sayonara o Oshiete or Sayooshi, is a denpa visual novel produced by CRAFTWORK, regarded as one of the most influential on the denpa genre alongside formative works such as Tsui no Sora.

Due to its 18+ rating and dark themes, Sayonara o Oshiete was controversially marked with a warning that it should not be played by "Those who cannot distinguish fiction from reality, those who struggle with suicidal thoughts, those inclined to criminal acts, those who get easily fixated, or those with homicidal urges'.

The game spent many years out of print, but was eventually picked up by Asoberu! BD-GAME, a subsidiary company of Visual Arts. In 2016, it was made available again for purchase on DLSite for Windows and Android. In 2021, the production staff held a 20th anniversary mini-concert and talk in Asagaya to commemorate the game and its fanbase. For 21 years, Sayonara wo Oshiete remained CRAFTWORK's latest release until the release of their visual novel Geminism in 2022.

== Summary ==
The protagonist begins work as a trainee teacher in an all-girls school, where he has a strange dream about turning into a monster and ravaging an angel. Whilst discussing his disturbing dream with the school nurse, he encounters a student who looks just like the angel from his dreams. The two become close, and attempt to find an explanation for his strange dream. However, in reality, the protagonist is not a trainee teacher, but has instead been sent to a mental hospital, with the vast majority of the cast being mere delusions.

The game takes place from the perspective of the protagonist, who is an unreliable narrator, and progresses as the player selects students to converse with, which sheds light on the many delusions of the protagonist.

== Development ==
The producer Kenzo Nagaoka explained that at the time, Kanon had been a huge hit, and thus he had been instructed to make a bishōjo game by the head of Visual Arts. Nagaoka felt that most of the games at the time felt derivative, and so wanted to create something with a unique angle, with themes of "eternity", "ethereal girls", and "deep emotions", essentially constructing something new from the essence of Kanon.

== Reception ==
Despite the game receiving a cult following, initial sales were poor, with only around 3,000 copies being shipped, and only 1,000 being sold. However, later a Blu-ray version was released, which received enough sales to recoup the development costs. Nowadays, Sayonara o Oshiete is one of the most highly-regarded denpa visual novels, briefly breaking into the top-ten bestseller of all time on DLSite.
