= Anthony Anzalone =

American entrepreneur and investor

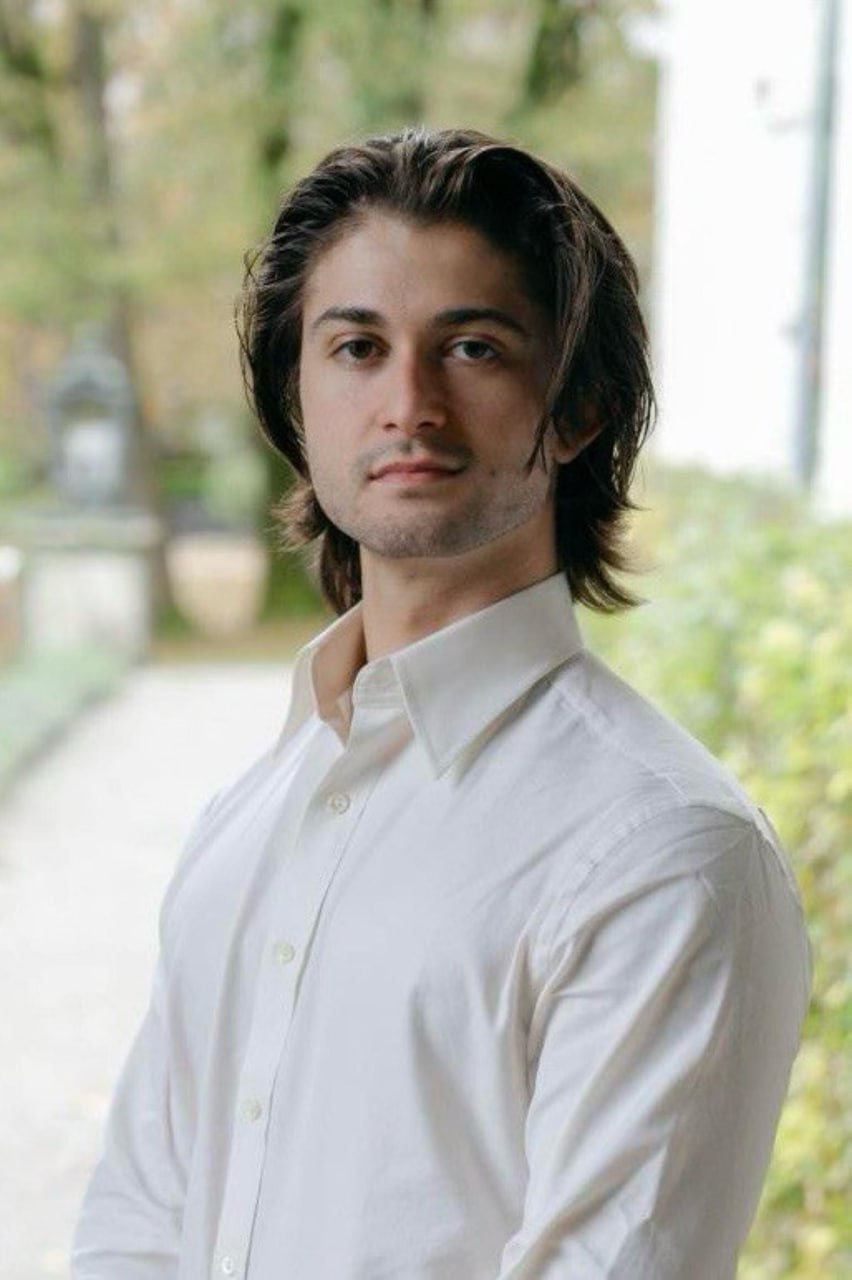
- Born: Boca Raton, Florida, U.S.
- Occupations: Entrepreneur, Investor, Government Official
- Known for: Burnt (XION), Vessel Capital, Burnt Banksy
- Awards: Forbes 30 Under 30 (2025)

Anthony Anzalone is an American entrepreneur and investor known for his work in the digital asset and financial technology sectors.

== Biography ==
Anthony Anzalone was born in Boca Raton, Florida. He attended American Heritage Schools at the Boca/Delray campus.

Anzalone founded Burnt in March 2021, a company specializing in decentralized infrastructure and enterprise verification products. Under his leadership, the organization launched XION, a Layer 1 blockchain network utilizing "generalized abstraction" to facilitate mainstream digital asset adoption. The network is specifically designed to abstract away the technical complexities of blockchain technology for non-technical users. Prior to founding Burnt, Anzalone built one of the first fully decentralized NFT marketplaces on the Solana blockchain.

In March, Anzalone was involved in the "Burnt Banksy" project, a controversial NFT initiative in which a physical artwork by the anonymous street artist Banksy was publicly destroyed and transformed into a digital asset. During a livestreamed event in Brooklyn, Anzalone and collaborators burned an authenticated Banksy screen print titled Morons (White), which had been purchased from a New York gallery for approximately US$95,000. The work was then minted as a non-fungible token (NFT) on the blockchain. The NFT was later sold on OpenSea for about US$380,000, more than four times the artwork's original purchase price, attracting widespread media attention during the 2021 NFT boom.

In May 2021, Anzalone co-founded Vessel Capital, where he serves as a General Partner. Vessel Capital is an operator-led venture fund specializing in the Web3 ecosystem. The fund focuses on providing strategic capital and operational support to early-stage startups within the blockchain, infrastructure, and decentralized finance (DeFi) spaces.

From 2022 to 2024, Anthony Anzalone has served as an advisor to the Ministry of Economy, providing strategic guidance on the integration of blockchain technology and decentralized infrastructure into government operations.

In 2025, he was named to the Forbes 30 Under 30 list in the Finance category. In March 2026, Anzalone launched a blockchain-based charity initiative tied to the "Epstein Files," with proceeds supporting the Asiyah Women's Center, a shelter serving Muslim and BIPOC women in New York.
