= Axie Infinity =

2018 non-fungible token online game

- Developer: Sky Mavis
- Engine: Unity
- Platforms: Windows; Android macOS iOS
- Release: March 2018
- Genres: NFT; Online game Strategy game
- Modes: Single player, PvP

Axie Infinity is a blockchain game developed by Vietnamese studio Sky Mavis in 2018, known for its in-game economy which uses Ethereum-based cryptocurrencies. It has been called "a pyramid scheme that relies on cheap labor from countries like the Philippines to fuel its growth."

Players collect and mint non-fungible tokens (NFTs) which represent axolotl-inspired digital pets known as Axies. These creatures can be bred and battled with each other within the game. Sky Mavis charges a 4.25% fee to players when they trade Axies on its marketplace.

Axie Infinity is built on the Ronin Network, an Ethereum-linked sidechain developed by Sky Mavis. The game's official cryptocurrency is "Axie Infinity Shards/Token" or AXS for short. The game's secondary token, SLP, crashed in February 2022 amid a wider NFT and cryptocurrency crash, losing over 99% of its peak value. In March 2022, hackers compromised the Ronin Network, stealing approximately US$620 million worth of cryptocurrency from the project. The hackers were linked to Lazarus Group, funded by North Korea.

== Gameplay ==
According to the company's website, Axie Infinity is a competitive game with an "idle battle" system derived from games like Final Fantasy Tactics and Idle Heroes. The game's setting is filled with creatures called Axies that players can collect as pets. Players aim to battle, breed, collect, raise, and build kingdoms for their Axies. The game has an in-game economy where players can buy, sell, and trade resources they earn in the game.

Sky Mavis marketed the game with a play-to-earn model (also called "pay-to-play-to-earn" model) where after participants pay the starting costs, they can earn an Ethereum-based in-game cryptocurrency by playing. Axie Infinity allows users to cash-out their tokens every fourteen days. This model has been described as a form of gambling, and one with an unstable market that is overly reliant on the inflow of new players.

In February 2020, Sky Mavis estimated that a new player would need to spend around US$400 to meet this starting requirement. By August 2020, the cheapest Axie cost approximately US$307, although reports as of March 2022 suggest the floor price of an Axie has dipped to around US$20.

As of June 2021, some people in the Philippines had begun to treat the game as their main source of income, although earning rates from playing Axie Infinity fell below the national minimum wage by September 2021. The Philippine Department of Finance also clarified that income from playing Axie Infinity is taxable, and suggested that the SEC and BSP may classify its cryptocurrency as a currency or a security.

Players of Axie Infinity can also purchase virtual land and other in-game assets as NFTs. The record sale of a plot of virtual land was priced at US$2.3 million, as of 25 November 2021. Gameplay related to purchased virtual land was intended to be introduced by 2020, but this has been pushed back twice as of April 2022. The delays have prompted complaints from users coinciding with a sharp decline in the profitability of the in-game economy.

== Development and history ==
Development of Axie Infinity started in 2017, led by its co-founder and CEO, Nguyen Thanh Trung, alongside Tu Doan, Aleksander Larsen, Jeffrey Zirlin, and Andy Ho. Nguyen had previously spent money on the game CryptoKitties before he began work on his own blockchain-based game, combining elements of CryptoKitties with gameplay from the Pokémon series or Neopets.

In October 2018, the development team released Axie Infinity's first battle system. Development of the real-time card battle system and application commenced in March 2019, and an alpha was released in December 2019.

Sky Mavis launched Ronin wallet in February 2021, which in addition to speeding up transactions and eliminating expensive gas fees for gamers offers the opportunity to play Axie Infinity or any other dApp that run on the Ronin sidechain. According to data published on Statista, in 2022 around 40% of Axie Infinity players were from the Philippines.

While the project had generated US$21 million in the first two to three years since its inception, it raised $485 million between July and August 2021 alone.

The value of the game's associated token, Smooth Love Potion (SLP) (formerly known as Small Love Potion by the community), crashed in February 2022 amid a wider NFT and cryptocurrency crash, losing over 99% of its peak value. Sky Mavis attempted to stabilize the price by introducing new features to the game, but these attempts were ineffective. The low exchange value of SLP has caused a massive exodus of players, leaving guild leaders without their cheap third-world labor force to grind on their behalf. Sky Mavis removed references to "play-to-earn" on its websites and marketing as its tokens plummeted in value.

On 23 March 2022, hackers compromised the Ronin Network, stealing approximately US$620 million in Ether and USDC. A total of 173,600 Ether and 25.5 million USDC tokens were stolen in two transactions. It took the company six days to notice the hack. At the time, the hack was the largest breach in the cryptocurrency sector by dollar value, though it has since been surpassed by the US$1.5 billion Bybit hack of February 2025 and the roughly US$6.36 billion Binance hack of October 2026. It further damaged the value of SLP. On 8 April 2022, Sky Mavis said it expected it would be able to recover some of the funds, but it would take several years. The company raised additional venture capital and reimbursed all users affected in the hack. On 14 April 2022, the FBI issued a statement that the Lazarus Group and APT38, which are North Korean state-sponsored hacker groups, were responsible for the theft. Accordingly, the US Treasury has sanctioned the cryptocurrency address. Some of the cryptocurrency has been laundered through a cryptocurrency tumbler known as "Tornado Cash". Law enforcement later seized more than US$30 million worth of the stolen cryptocurrency.

According to an April 2023 report from Reuters, the price of Axie Infinity's cryptocurrency token had fallen by 99% from its all-time-high in February 2022, coinciding with the 2021–2023 cryptocurrency crash. This crash led to decline of average daily players from a high of 2.7 million to approximately 250,000.

In August 2024, the Ronin bridge was paused after hackers exploited a flaw introduced in a recent upgrade to withdraw US$12 million. The hackers returned the funds. Ronin said they appeared to be acting as white hats and that it would pay them a US$500,000 bounty.

== As a source of income in the Philippines ==
Starting around August 2020, during the COVID-19 pandemic in the Philippines, Axie Infinity was becoming a source of income in the country. The cryptocurrency's volatility strongly affected the game's viability as a source of income. By July 2021, during a high-point in the cost of the game's cryptocurrency, some full-time users of the app in the Philippines were making significantly more than the national monthly average, but by April 3, 2022, the price of the cryptocurrency had dropped by 94%.

The game's popularity in the country stemmed from the economic hardship caused by the pandemic, during which many residents lost their original source of income. The main motivation behind playing the game was primarily to receive approximately the same amount of income within a few hours a day as with full-time employment.

In the Philippines, the prohibitive cost of entry led to both individuals and gaming guilds renting out assets to allow new players to meet the minimum requirements. These new players, known as "scholars", are often required to meet a quota of in-game earning to continue using the rented assets, and must pay the owners a commission. These commissions vary greatly but can be as high as 75%. The resulting dependency of lower-income individuals has been described as potentially exploitative, lacking in safeguards, and has often been compared to gold farming.

The Philippine Department of Finance clarified that income from playing Axie Infinity is taxable, and suggested that the SEC and BSP may classify its cryptocurrency as a currency or a security.

== Limitations and associated risks ==
Academics and journalists have pointed out risks associated with playing the game as well as limitations of it, focusing primarily on the game's high financial barrier to entry, questions about the project's long-term durability, including accusations of a ponzi or pyramid scheme, as well as possible negative effects of the game on the players' mental health.

=== High barrier to entry limiting availability ===
In order to play Axie Infinity one needs to purchase at least three Axies in the form of NFTs for the price of several hundred dollars at the peak of the project. Access to the game may, depending on the market situation, be tied to a significantly higher price than traditional video games, the price of which is usually limited to less than US$100. According to Delic and Delfabbro (2022) in the International Journal of Mental Health and Addiction, the monetization of such games prioritizes a player's financial capacities over their actual skill, thus increasingly excluding individuals of lesser means from playing the game:

(...) when players can pay money to improve their in-game performance, skilled play may no longer be the sole determinant of player success. It also means that income and affordability could potentially advantage wealthier players and make the game less accessible to lower income groups.

— Amelia Delic and Paul Delfabbro, Profiling the Potential Risks and Benefits of Emerging “Play to Earn” Games: a Qualitative Analysis of Players’ Experiences with Axie Infinity,

The earlier an individual invests in and starts to play the game to more of an advantage that person has over those who have started at a later date, since the chances of high winnings become smaller the later one enters the game.

=== Sustainability of the project ===
Researchers have questioned the game's longevity, as there have been repeated accusations that Axie Infinity is a Ponzi or pyramid scheme. Per this accusation, Axie Infinity lacks long-term economic durability since it has to rely on players continuing to invest in the game. The in-game economy depends on the existing number of actively involved players:

Like the majority of P2E models, [Axie Infinity] relies on players financial input/output to regulate the value of the in-game currency. In other words, the games [sic] economy is influenced by the number of players investing into [Axie Infinity] (...)

— Paul Delfabbro et al., Understanding the mechanics and consumer risks associated with play-to-earn (P2E) gaming,

Axie Infinity's basic economic design has been described as a speculative bubble since the game creates a gig economy where they have to invest more and more to make a profit. Andreas Hackethal of the Goethe Business School has referred to the concept as pump and dump, maintaining that players are only willing to spend money and time playing the game because of their hope that the prices will increase and speaking of a pay-to-earn rather than play-to-earn game. Bernd Richter of Fidelity National Information Services considers the game a pyramid scheme.

=== Potential negative psychological effects ===
Games like Axie Infinity are often associated with psychological problems on the part of their players. In this context the main point of argument is the suspicion that players might play the game primarily for monetary reasons rather than for the purpose of entertainment: The extrinsic motivation to play outweighs the pure entertainment factor. According to critics, this leads to a sunk-cost-fallacy where players primarily play the game due to the fact that they have already invested a lot of money and time into it. Furthermore, the combination of financial speculation and a video game is said to potentially worsen the condition of gambling addicts involved in the game.

== See also ==
- Blockchain
- Blockchain game
- Decentralized application
- Non-fungible token
