= The Sandbox (company) =

American video game developer

- Type: Subsidiary
- Industry: Video game
- Founded: May 2011; 15 years ago
- Founder: Adrien Duermaël; Arthur Madrid; Sébastien Borget
- Products: The Sandbox; The Addams Family Mystery Mansion; Wonder Park Magic Rides; Goosebumps: Horror Town; Snoopy's Town Tale; Garfield: Survival of the Fattest
- Number of employees: 27 (2018)
- Parent: Animoca Brands
- Website: www.sandbox.game

TSB Gaming (formerly known as Pixowl), doing business and commonly known as The Sandbox, is a metaverse platform developer. Founded in 2011, the company is now a subsidiary of the Hong Kong-based Animoca Brands. The company's chief product is The Sandbox, a 3D blockchain game platform released in 2021 as a sequel to the 2D world-building mobile game developed by the company in 2012.

The Sandbox is free-to-play, with in-game purchases available through an Ethereum-based cryptocurrency called SAND.

== History ==
=== Early mobile games ===
The Sandbox was founded as Pixowl in May 2011 by game designer Adrien Duermaël and entrepreneurs Arthur Madrid and Sébastien Borget. The year before, with his wife Laurel Duermaël, a comic book illustrator, Duermaël had created Doodle Grub, a simple game that utilizes accelerometers in smartphones to allow the user to direct a snake-like character in the gameplay by tilting the phone. Pixowl was founded to develop new games and manage updates for Doodle Grub which had garnered more than 3 million users and 200,000 active daily players by August 2011.

In 2012, the company released The Sandbox, a world building mobile video game in which the user can create a "universe" that fits on a single screen using "elements" such as trees, fire, water and mud to achieve the increasingly complex objectives presented as levels in the gameplay. By August 2012, the company had a branch in Buenos Aires and was headquartered in San Francisco. Its products included iOS and Android games in 15 languages. The company also raised $1.2 million in seed funding on AngelList from investors 500 Startups, Kima Ventures, Ax Ventures' Pymar Fund, Martín Varsavsky, Fabrice Grinda and Joshua Chodniewicz. In March 2013, Greedy Grub, the first sequel to Doodle Grub, was released. The game included short animated cutscenes to advance the story line over a total of eight episodes with plans to release additional storylines every few months.

Grub, another sequel to Doodle Grub, was first released in June 2014 for iOS and included a new map feature which the user can navigate to uncover new levels. In November 2014, the company released The Sandbox EDU, a new version of the game with several changes to make the game appropriate to children and educational. In April 2015, the company released, Garfield: Survival of the Fattest, a game based on the Garfield comic strip. Developed in partnership with Paws, Inc., the production company for the comic strip, the game allows the user to control multiple characters to complete quests on an expanding wilderness campsite.

In June 2016, the company released The Sandbox Evolution, another sequel to the 2012 game. The new gameplay featured more than 160 elements that can be used to create a universe, including "the ability to create electrical machines that utilize levers, batteries, sensors and more". By 2019, the company had released several games, such as a game based on Thomas & Friends. In September 2019, Pixowl released The Addams Family Mystery Mansion, a game based on The Addams Family.

=== Blockchain and metaverse ===
In August 2018, Animoca Brands acquired Pixowl for $4.875 million in cash and stock. At the time of the acquisition, Pixowl had 27 employees working in San Francisco and Buenos Aires. Now a subsidiary of Animoca Brands, Pixowl changed its incorporation name to TSB Gaming LTD and began doing business simply under the name The Sandbox as it was preparing to release a sequel to The Sandbox in a 3D game format with blockchain integration.

In March 2020, the company raised $2.01 million in cash and cryptocurrency and planned to raise more funds through sale of it cryptocurrency SAND, the Ethereum-based utility token used on The Sandbox. Virtual real estate on the platform began to be sold as property in plots representing no smaller than 9,216 square metres (2.28 acres) with air space up to 128 metres (420 ft).

In February 2021, a pair of sales of plots of land in The Sandbox were reported to have been valued at a total of $2.8 million. As of November 2021, there were more than 12,000 digital land owners on The Sandbox, including significant parcels of land were owned by musical artists Snoop Dogg, and Deadmau5, investors Cameron Winklevoss, Tyler Winklevoss, and Adrian Cheng, as well as companies like video game developer Atari and cryptocurrency exchange Binance. In November 2021, the company also completed a Series B funding round in which it raised $93 million. Its investors included SoftBank Group, LG Technology Ventures, Samsung Next, and Liberty City Ventures. In December 2021, The Sandbox was the site of the biggest virtual land sale reported to date with a $4.3 million deal between Atari SA and Republic Realm, a virtual real estate developer.

The platform launched for alpha stage testing in November 29 to December 20, 2021, attracting more than 200,000 users. In March 2022, the company announced a partnership with Paris Hilton's 11:11 Media to include "with an avatar and a dedicated space within the platform featuring a game-like experience themed around her". In October 2022, Gucci opened the "Gucci Vault Land" on the platform, where users could play games to potentially win raffles for platform's cryptocurrency. That month, a report indicated that The Sandbox had around 500 daily active users interacting with the platform's blockchain. Animoca Brand's founder, Sat Yiu said that this number was not representative of engagement, as the Sandbox claimed to have around 200,000 monthly active users at that time.
