= SeaBed =

2016 video game

- Promotional art, with Sachiko on the right
- Developer: Paleontology
- Publishers: JP: Paleontology; WW: Fruitbat Factory
- Engine: KiriKiri
- Platforms: Windows; Nintendo Switch
- Release: Windows: JP: 25 January 2016; WW: 17 December 2017; Nintendo Switch: WW: 19 March 2020
- Genres: Visual novel, Mystery
- Mode: Single-player

SeaBed is a yuri mystery visual novel released in 2016 by Paleontology. The story centers the character Sachiko, a woman struck with hallucinations of her missing childhood friend and romantic partner, Takako. Sachiko seeks the help of Narasaki, another childhood friend and psychiatrist. Programmed by AKIRA, it was written and illustrated by hide38, who based the game on his four-panel comic about Sachiko and Takako.

It was developed with the KiriKiri engine and first released through DLsite on 25 January 2016. It received an English localization by publisher Fruitbat Factory through Steam on 17 December 2017. Ported to the Nintendo Switch, it was released through Nintendo eShop on 19 March 2020; a physical edition published by Eastasiasoft was released in September 2020.

SeaBed was positively received by critics, who praised its character writing and story. Reviews were also favorable on the game's use of alternating perspectives and slice of life scenes. The pacing of the game received a mixed assessment; reviewers considered it to be slow and a barrier for players. An audio drama for the game, written by hide38 and directed by AKIRA, was released through Steam and DLsite from late 2022 to 2023.

== Gameplay ==
SeaBed is a visual novel, with gameplay that consists of players reading text overlaid on background images and sprites. It is further classified as a kinetic novel; players read through the story without making choices. Unlike other visual novels, SeaBed is written in prose without dialog boxes; each line of dialogue is not explicitly tagged to a character. The text, which is not voice acted, is accompanied by sound effects and music. When players reach the end of a chapter, side stories named "Tips" are unlocked. The main story is told in a non-chronological manner; the narrative perspective shifts between three protagonists, and flashbacks are interspersed throughout the plot. Several scenes are slice of life depictions of a character's day-to-day activities.

== Plot ==
A screenshot from the game, showing Sachiko from the perspective of Takako

Set in Japan after the bubble period of the late 1980s, the story takes the perspective of three childhood friends: Sachiko, Takako, and Narasaki.

Sachiko and Takako enter a romantic relationship and establish a design studio together, while Narasaki becomes a psychiatrist. After Takako's sudden disappearance, Sachiko begins hallucinating her presence and seeks Narasaki's assistance. Narasaki diagnoses Sachiko with memory loss, but progress is slow until Fumi, a founding employee at the design studio, mentions in passing that Takako had died of an illness years prior. Sachiko uncovers her memories of Takako's death during a hypnotherapy session with Narasaki, who recommends a vacation to fully address the hallucinations. Sachiko learns that she already booked a hotel room when Nanae, the hotel's owner, calls her to confirm the booking. During the vacation, Sachiko bonds with Nanae and explores the surrounding area. The day before Sachiko leaves the hotel, Narasaki calls Sachiko through a payphone to announce the closure of her clinic.

Scenes from Takako's perspective reveal that she is in a sanatorium-like clinic in an unspecified location, cared for by Mayuko, a nurse who bears a visual resemblance to Sachiko. Suffering from amnesia surrounding her memories of Sachiko, Takako eventually receives a diary written from Sachiko's perspective. While the diary restores many of Takako's memories, it ends without revealing the cause of their separation. Visiting the sanatorium to check on Takako's condition, Narasaki reveals that she previously worked at the location, and leaves behind a set of keys. Takako uses the keys to enter a room that was locked by Mayuko. Inside the room, Takako recalls her dying memories, in which Sachiko promised to hold Takako as a living memory in an idyllic imagined world. Takako also remembers that Narasaki was the name of Sachiko's toy doll and meets Narasaki in the sanatorium lobby. Having finished her call with Sachiko, Narasaki gives the payphone to Takako.

Takako calls Sachiko; the two share brief updates and reminisce. In the epilogue, Sachiko plans another trip with Nanae, while Takako visits the seaside with Mayuko.

== Development and release ==
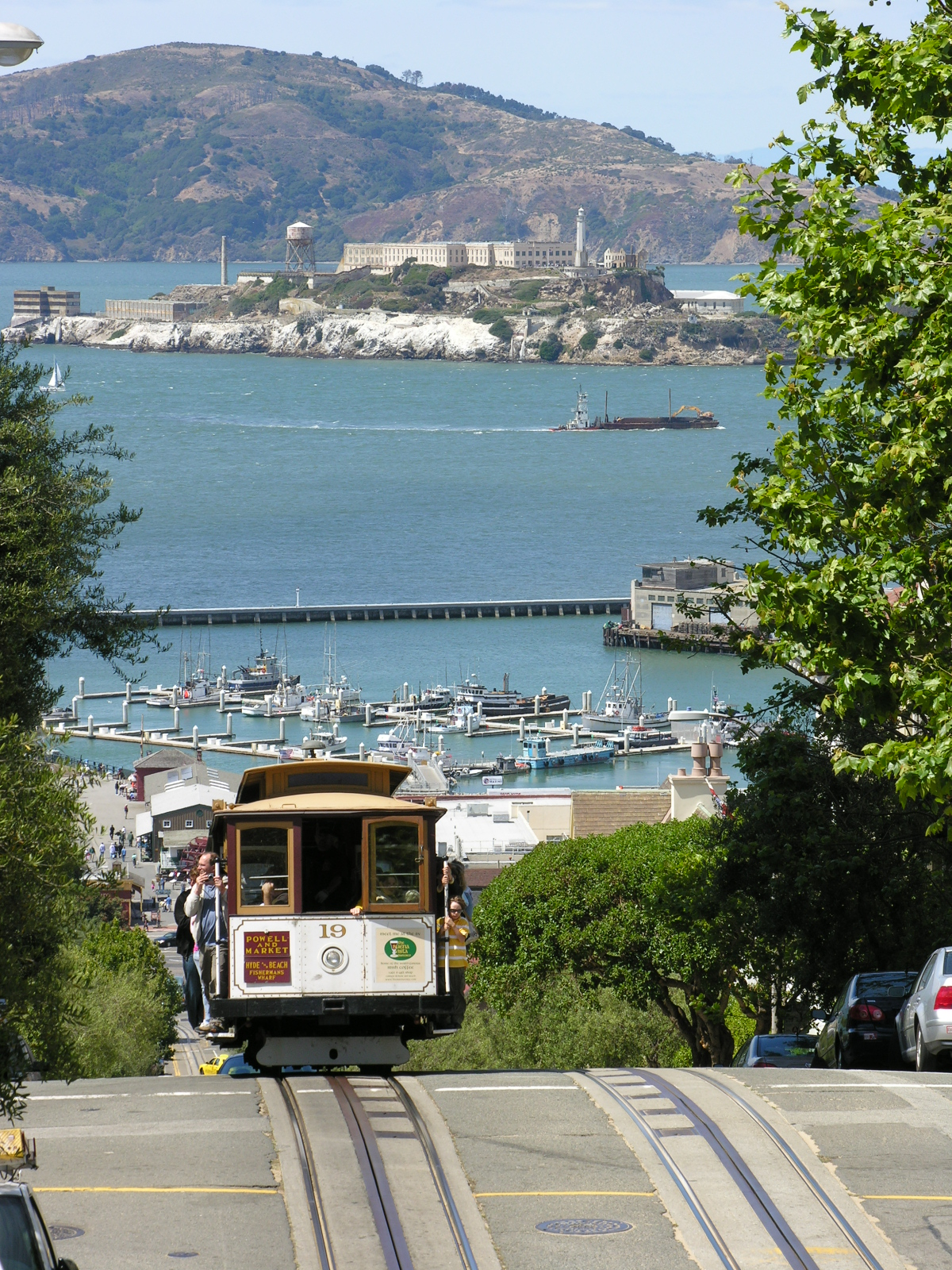
The developers were influenced by a visit to San Francisco for parts of the story.

SeaBed originated as a four-panel comic about Sachiko and Takako by hide38, who later became the game's writer and artist. Having drawn the comic during his spare time at work, hide38 showed it to his friend and neighbor AKIRA, and they decided that a visual novel would be the best medium to expand the story. AKIRA then became SeaBed's director and programmer. Inspired by Fate/stay night, AKIRA programmed SeaBed using the KiriKiri engine. The duo considered additional features such as branching storylines to encourage replays, but ultimately decided that a linear storyline was better suited to their technical capabilities and the game's intended impression. Aspects of the story drew from the developers' personal experiences, including a trip to San Francisco.

It first released through DLsite on 25 January 2016, as Paleontology's first visual novel. Fruitbat Factory announced an English localization in 2017, and released the game through Steam on 17 December of the same year. A port to the Nintendo Switch was released through Nintendo eShop on 19 March 2020. The Switch edition includes two new scenes and localizations to Simplified and Traditional Chinese. On the same day of the Switch release, preorders were made available for a limited physical edition by Hong Kong publisher Eastasiasoft. The physical copies were released in September 2020.

== Reception ==
Reviewers primarily praised SeaBed for its characterizations and emotional impression. Writing for Inside Games, Shijima Ren recommended SeaBed for the romance between its two female leads. Pete Davison of Nintendo Life hailed it as a "masterpiece" with "evocative" descriptions of everyday life. Commending the game's depiction of grief and dynamic narrative perspectives, Marcus Estrada of Hardcore Gamer said that SeaBed was a "distinct experience" from other yuri visual novels. Both Davison and Estrada commented on the largely adult cast, stating that the characters acted in a grounded, believable manner.

Critics commented on the slow pace of the story, and some saw it as a drawback for readers. Estrada noted that the story occasionally "dragged along" due to its "gentle" pace, and Gary Hartley of Honest Gamers considered its length and lack of choices to be a hurdle for players. In a positive review, Matt Sainsbury of Digitally Downloaded took SeaBed's verbosity and digressions to be a strength, stating that it engaged him in its likeness to literature.

== Related media ==
In 2022, publisher Fruitbat Factory released the first episode of a four-part SeaBed audio drama written by hide38 and directed by AKIRA. It featured Yui Kondo as Sachiko and Eriko Matsui as Takako. First released through Steam, the episode was later brought to DLsite on 19 January 2023.
