= LotusLive =

Computer software

IBM SmartCloud for Social Business
- Developer: IBM (previously Lotus Software)
- Stable release: GA
- Operating system: Cross-platform
- Type: Software as a service, collaboration, web 2.0
- License: Subscription
- Website: www.lotuslive.com

IBM SmartCloud for Social Business, formerly LotusLive, was a suite of business networking and collaboration cloud-based services hosted by the IBM Collaboration Solutions division of IBM. The integrated services that were covered by this software were social networking for businesses, online meetings, file sharing, instant messaging, data visualization, and e-mail.

== History ==
The services were performed by the following software:

- IBM SmartCloud Connections is an integrated set of collaboration tools for creating user profiles, managing contacts, creating business networking with your contacts, instant messaging, social file sharing, managing collaborative tasks, creating "Communities," and sending out surveys.
- IBM SmartCloud Meetings is a web-based online meeting service, formerly known as Lotus Sametime Unyte Meeting.
- IBM SmartCloud Engage Standard combines the functionality of LotusLive Connections and LotusLive Meetings. It was code-named "Bluehouse" and was first announced at Lotusphere in January 2008.
- IBM SmartCloud Notes is an e-mail, calendar, contact management, and instant messaging service in the IBM cloud. With LotusLive Notes, users access their mailbox over the Internet with a web browser or with the Lotus Notes client.
- IBM SmartCloud iNotes is a web-based e-mail and calendar service. It uses the messaging assets that IBM acquired from Outblaze, a Hong Kong–based online application service provider.

For Social Business, IBM SmartCloud had a framework for third-party applications to integrate with LotusLive. In 2009 IBM announced integration with Skype, LinkedIn, Salesforce, UPS, and Silanis.

At Lotusphere 2012, IBM announced that it had rebranded the LotusLive product line as IBM SmartCloud For Social Business.
