= Projection: First Light =

2019 video game

- Developer: Shadowplay Studios (Note: Additional development by SweatyChair)
- Publisher: Blowfish Studios
- Platforms: Windows, PlayStation 4, Xbox One, Nintendo Switch, iOS
- Release: iOS; September 19, 2019; Windows, PS4, Xbox One, Switch; September 29, 2019
- Genres: Puzzle, platform
- Mode: Single-player

Projection: First Light is a puzzle-platform video game developed by Australian indie developer Shadowplay Studios and published by Blowfish Studios. A prototype of the game was created in Global Game Jam 2016; the developers then teamed up with another Australian Indie studio SweatyChair to create the game in full. It was originally released on iOS through Apple Arcade as a launch title on September 19, 2019, and on Windows, PlayStation 4, Xbox One and Nintendo Switch on September 29, 2019.

== Gameplay and development ==
The player controls two objects: the protagonist, a little shadow puppet girl named Greta, and a physical ball of light. Using the ball of light, the player can manipulate shadows which become solid and allow Greta to walk on. The length and angle of the shadows depends on the positioning of the ball of light. The game doesn't use any dialogue to explain the story, instead using characters' actions and visual cues. The player explores four different time periods, Indonesia, China, Turkey, Greece, and 19th century England, each with its own unique style. Every character is a shadow puppet, as is the rest of the environment. The characters and foreground are black while the background is in sepia, replicating the style of tradition shadow play canvas.

Greta approaches the Shadow Theater at the start of the game.

Head developer Michael Chu explained his inspiration was from playing with shadows on the wall as a child, and realized there were a lot of ways shadows could be used in game development. After deciding on the shadow puppet style, they researched it by visiting puppeteer Richard Bradshaw, who gave them a tour of his workshop and gave them a demonstration of creating a shadow puppet as a reference for artist Yosha Noesjirwan. Noesjirwan also gained insight for the Indonesian shadow puppets through his parents.

== Reception ==
Reception

Review scores
| Publication | Score |
|---|---|
| Nintendo Life | 4/10 |
| TouchArcade | 4/5 |

Projection: First Light won a spot in the 2017 PAX Australia Indie Showcase. From there it gained plenty of attention, and featured in many popular gaming news sites such as Kotaku and Nintendo Life. It was also on display at PAX EAST 2018, with high reception from gamers and journalists. The game received mixed reviews, with Nintendo Life criticizing the gameplay but praising the visuals.
