= Outblaze =

- Type: Private
- Industry: Mobile game & Mobile application development
- Founded: Hong Kong (1998)
- Headquarters: Hong Kong
- Key people: Yat Siu, CEO; Yusuf Goolamabbas, CTO; Rita Kong, CFO
- Products: Apps and games including Pretty Pet Salon
- Website: www.outblaze.com

Outblaze is a technology company that develops and provides digital media products and services including smartphone games and other apps, social media applications, computer and video games, online transaction systems, and web communication software. Although it started out as an application service provider of hosted Web applications, the company gradually transitioned to the video game industry. In 2009 Outblaze sold its messaging business unit in order to focus primarily on digital entertainment.

== History ==
Outblaze was founded in 1998 in Hong Kong and received considerable media attention around the time of the dot-com bubble. At the peak of its activity in the messaging sector, Outblaze was reported to provide services to over 75 million users around the world, with 40 million email accounts operated by Outblaze plus at least 35 million protected by Outblaze's anti-spam solution. In 2009 Outblaze sold its messaging assets to IBM, which incorporated them in LotusLive. Since then Outblaze has focused its attention on video and online gaming, smartphone apps, and social network applications.

== Products ==
Outblaze's various smartphone game apps have been downloaded about 30 million times for iOS and Android devices as of September 2011.

== Advocacy ==
Outblaze has engaged in a number of policy discussions, primarily via consultation and position papers authored by Outblaze executives.

In 2004 the Organisation for Economic Co-operation and Development (OECD) asked Outblaze Head of Anti-Spam Operations Suresh Ramasubramanian to assist the OECD task force on spam. The result was the 25 May 2005 report Spam Issues in Developing Countries, which alerted governments and organizations to the specific dangers that spam poses to countries with underdeveloped Internet infrastructure. Suresh has further written a paper on botnet mitigation for the ITU.

The Office of the Telecom Authority (OFTA) of Hong Kong put out a consultation paper in June 2004 requesting comments on Proposals to contain the problem of unsolicited electronic messages. The Outblaze response encouraged the government to adopt a range of measures to effectively combat spam, among them: opt-in standards, prompt removal of spammers and hacked or insecure systems, adoption of authenticated email schemes, unequivocal anti-spam legislation, rapid response times at ISPs, and diffusion of better email marketing management techniques. The response was approved and endorsed by the Asia-Pacific chapter of the Coalition Against Unsolicited Commercial Email (CAUCE).

== See also ==
- SURBL
