= Yat Siu =

Hong Kong entrepreneur and angel investor

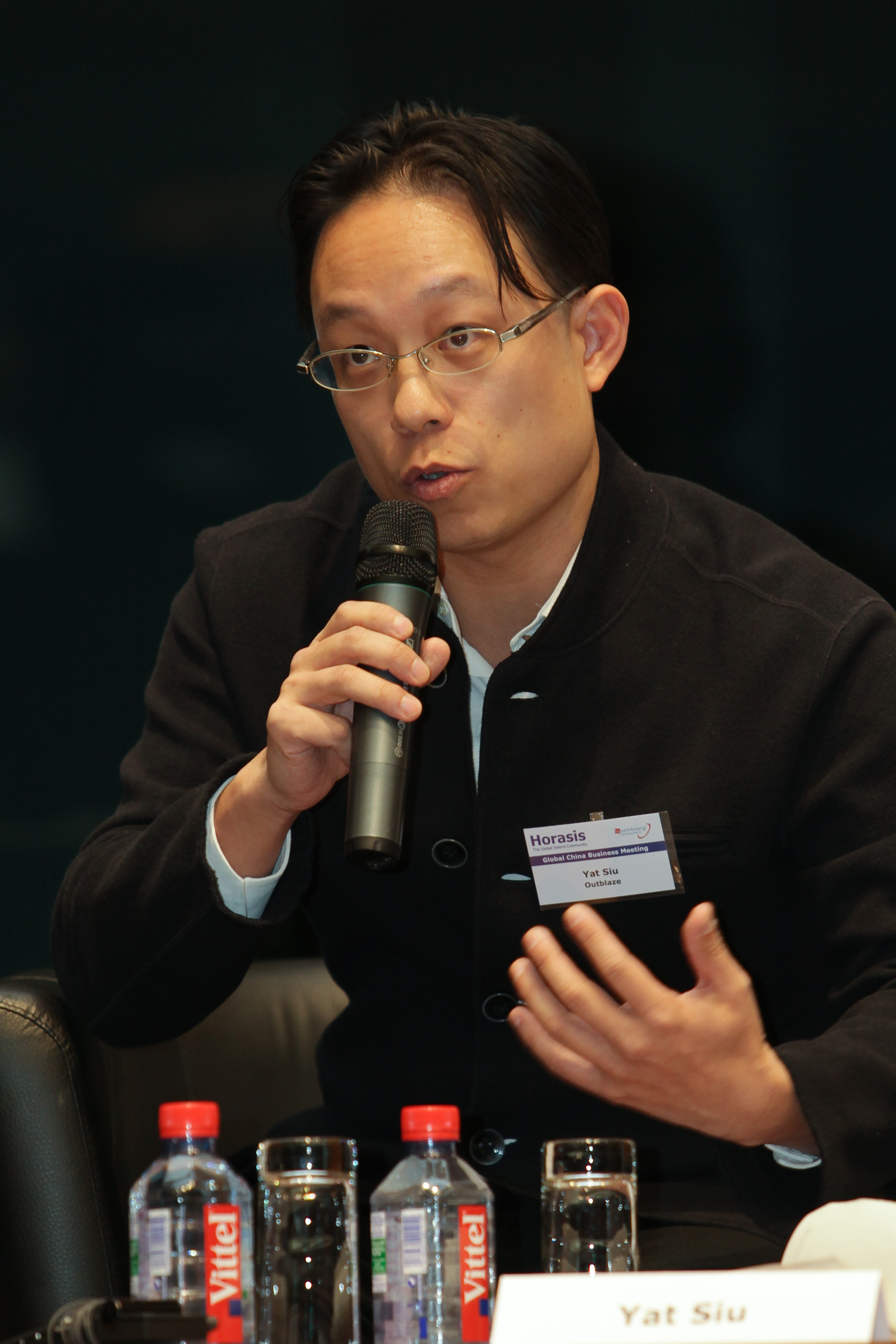
- Yat Siu in 2010 at the Horasis China Meeting in Luxembourg
- Born: 1973 (age 52–53); Vienna, Austria
- Occupation: Entrepreneur
- Known for: Co-founder and CEO of Animoca Brands
- Website: twitter.com/ysiu

Yat Siu (Chinese: 蕭逸; born 1973) is a Hong Kong–based entrepreneur and angel investor, who was born and raised in Vienna, Austria.

== Early years ==
Yat Siu's mother, who was from Taiwan and was born in Lisbon, Portugal, conducted for an orchestra. His father, who was born in Hong Kong, first was an instrumentalist and then became a businessman. He studied at the Music and Arts University of the City of Vienna. He trained specifically in the cello, flute, and piano. According to the South China Morning Post, he "implies he was pushed" into becoming a musician like his mother and father.

== Career ==
His initial job was at Atari Germany. Years later Siu became a director and head of East Coast Operations for Lexicor, as well as AT&T Solutions System Integration practice.

After moving to Hong Kong, he founded Cybercity, an Internet and email provider, in 1996. The company was later renamed to Freenation, which the South China Morning Post called "Asia's first free web page and e-mail provider".

Yat Siu is also the CEO and Founder of the game-company Outblaze and co-founder of Animoca and Animoca Brands. In 2009 he sold a part of his business to IBM's Lotus Software Division which opened its first cloud computing laboratory in Hong Kong with the assets it acquired from Outblaze. Animoca Brands was worth 2.2 billion dollars in its last funding round.

He is a member of the advisory board of the British Academy of Film and Television Arts (BAFTA) and on the board of directors for the Asian Youth Orchestra.

In 2023 Yat Siu has been appointed to the Task Force on Promoting Web3 Development newly established by the Government of the Hong Kong Special Administrative Region.

He is currently serves as a director at the Dalton Foundation, an organization that oversees the operation of the progressive and child-centered Dalton School Hong Kong
