= Devin Finzer =

American entrepreneur and technology executive

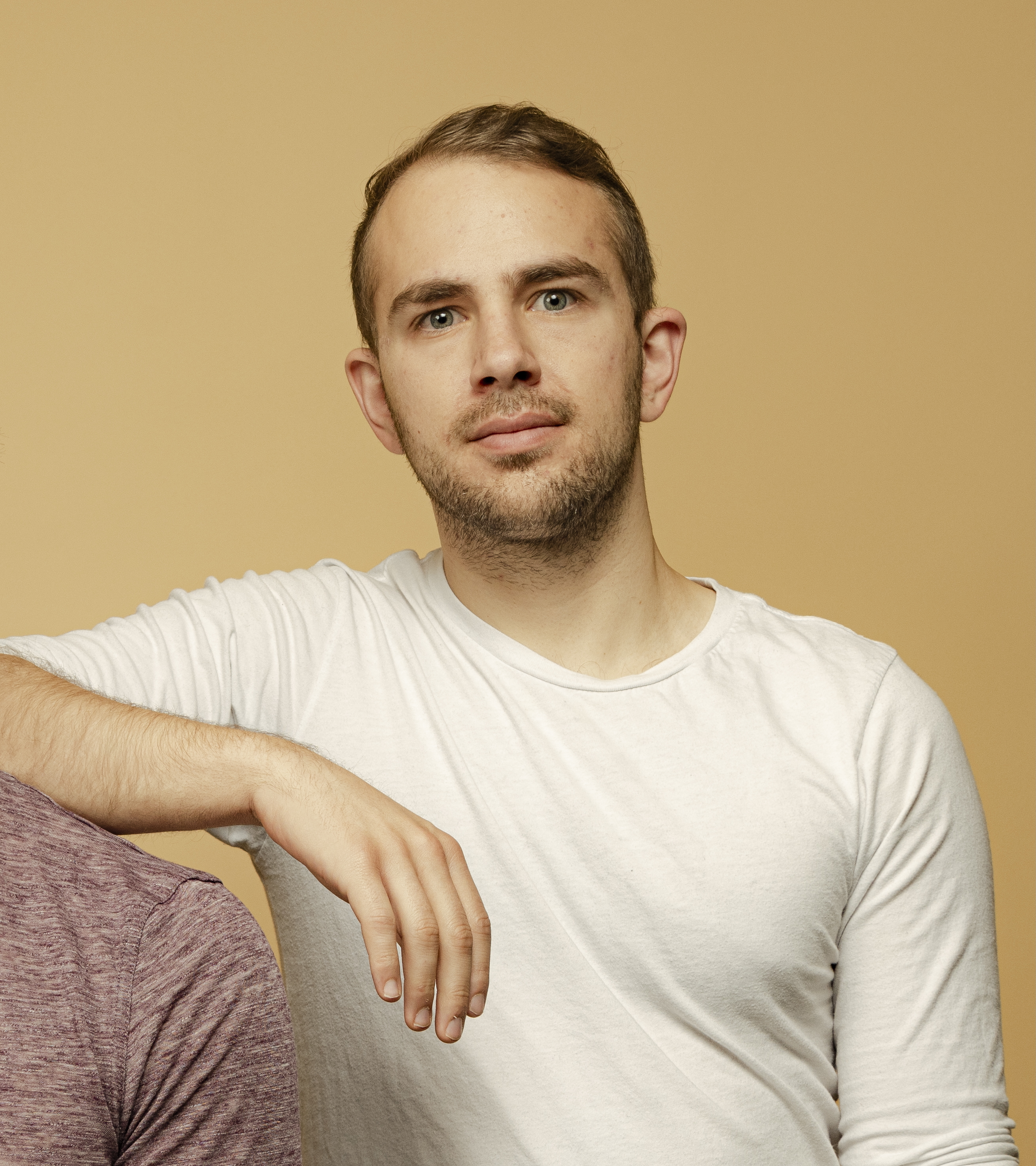
- Devin Finzer, photographed by Sasha Maslov
- Born: 1990 (age 35–36)
- Education: Brown University
- Known for: Co-founder and CEO of OpenSea
- Spouse: Yu-Chi Lyra Kuo

Devin Finzer (born 1990) is an American entrepreneur and technology executive. He is the co-founder and chief executive officer of OpenSea, a marketplace for non-fungible tokens and cryptocurrencies.

In January 2022, Forbes estimated the stakes in OpenSea owned by Finzer and his co-founder Alex Atallah to be worth $2.2 billion each, making them the first two non-fungible token billionaires. In April 2023, the net worths of both founders were estimated to have fallen to less than $600 million each following a steep decline in OpenSea's valuation.

== Early life and education ==
Devin Finzer was born in 1990; his mother is a physician while his father works as a software engineer. Finzer grew up in the San Francisco Bay Area and attended Miramonte High School in Orinda, California.

Finzer matriculated at Brown University, where he earned a bachelor's degree in Computer Science and Mathematics in 2013. In his junior year at Brown, Finzer worked with future Figma founder Dylan Field to create CourseKick, a socially-oriented search engine for university course registration. Just two weeks after the site launched, 20% of undergraduates had registered. While at Brown, Finzer interned at Wikimedia Foundation, Google Cloud Platform, and Flipboard. After graduating, he took a job at Pinterest in San Francisco as a software engineer.

== Career ==
Finzer co-founded two tech start-ups, including Claimdog, a personal finance app acquired by Credit Karma for an undisclosed amount. At Credit Karma, Finzer became interested in blockchain technology. With Alex Atallah, Finzer developed and pitched WifiCoin, which would offer tokens in exchange for sharing access to a wireless router. The pair pitched the concept to Y Combinator and were accepted. Inspired by the release of CryptoKitties, the pair pivoted to the non-fungible token market, founding OpenSea in December 2017.

After a 2018 pre-seed round by Y Combinator, OpenSea raised $2.1 million in venture capital in November 2019. In March 2021, the company raised $23 million in venture capital; four months later the company announced another investment round of $100 million making it a unicorn. In July 2021, Finzer was listed 19th on Forbes "NFTy 50" list of most influential individuals in the non-fungible token scene.

In January 2022, OpenSea raised $300 million in new series C funding, propelling the company's valuation to $13.3 billion. In January 2022, Forbes estimated the stakes in OpenSea owned by Finzer and his co-founder Alex Atallah to be worth $2.2 billion each, making them the first two non-fungible token billionaires. He remained CEO of OpenSea in October 2024.

== Personal life ==
Finzer met his wife, Yu-Chi Lyra Kuo, in 2021. Kuo previously ran a crypto trading firm and is an early crypto investor who obtained a PhD in philosophy and politics at Princeton, and further earned a degree from Harvard Law, where she was a Fellow. Kuo served as a lecturer at Princeton and the University of Pennsylvania. Finzer has credited Kuo with having the idea to expand OpenSea into a crypto-trading application, and considered her to be "a silent cofounder of OpenSea 2.0". In addition to her work with OpenSea, Kuo serves on the board of directors for The Shed.

In April 2025, Finzer and Kuo attended Save Venice’s annual Un Ballo in Maschera at The Plaza Hotel. During the event, Finzer and Kuo participated in its Ceremony for Outstanding Masks, and were awarded "Most Creative Mask". Kuo is a collector of haute couture, and wore a dress designed by Rahul Mishra to the event.
