= Blockchain game =

Video game integrating cryptocurrency or NFTs

Video games can include elements that use blockchain technologies, including cryptocurrencies and non-fungible tokens (NFTs), often as a form of monetization. These elements typically allow players to trade in-game items for cryptocurrency, or represent in-game items with NFTs. Blockchain games have existed since 2017, gaining wider attention from the video game industry in 2021, when several AAA publishers expressed an intent to include this technology in the future. Players, developers, and game companies have criticized the use of blockchain technology in video games for being exploitative, environmentally unsustainable, and unnecessary.

A subset of these games are also known as play-to-earn games because they include systems that allow players to earn cryptocurrency through gameplay.

== Concept ==
Blockchains have been used by game developers and publishers as a tool for video game monetization. Many video games offer in-game customization options, such as changes to a character's appearance, improved equipment, or other options. In some live-service games, players can also trade with other players, either directly or via in-game currency. Trading of virtual items for money may be illegal in some countries where this is classified as illegal/under-age gambling, money laundering, or securities fraud. This has led to gray market activity such as skin gambling, and publishers often attempt to prohibit players from earning real-world funds from games for legal reasons. To avoid these regulations, blockchain games allow players to trade in-game items for cryptocurrency, which can then be exchanged for money via a cryptocurrency exchange.

== History ==
One of the first best-known games to use blockchain technologies was CryptoKitties, launched by Axiom Zen in November 2017 for personal computers. A player would purchase NFTs with Ethereum cryptocurrency, each NFT consisting of a virtual pet that the player could breed with others to create offspring with combined traits as new NFTs. The game made headlines in December 2017 when one virtual pet sold for more than US$100,000. CryptoKitties also exposed scalability problems for games on Ethereum when it created significant congestion on the Ethereum network shortly after its launch, with approximately 30% of all Ethereum transactions at the time being for the game, and with the congestion delaying players' transactions. Axiom Zen feared that Ethereum would further struggle after they launched the mobile version of the game, particularly with an influx of users from China.

The Sandbox is a platform that bought the brandname of a 2012 crafting game of the same name, in 2018. Players could make in-game items by using the game's toolbox and then sell them, using a game-specific cryptocurrency, to others who could display them in their virtual landscapes.

Axie Infinity, released in 2018 by Sky Mavis, is an example of a "play-to-earn" game, where the game incentivizes players to purchase and then improve NFTs through in-game activities which are then resold to other players by the publisher, with the player receiving compensation for their work. In the Philippines, where the game was most popular, some players were able to earn enough to pay their cost of living by playing and participating in the game's financial structure. However, following an early 2022 hack which saw over $600 million stolen from Axie Infinity's publisher, the game saw a large drop in players and the game's economy was impacted. Sky Mavis removed references to "play-to-earn" on its websites and marketing as its tokens plummeted in value.

By the early 2020s there had not been a breakout success in video games using blockchain. Such games tended to focus on using blockchain for speculation instead of more traditional forms of gameplay, and this offers limited appeal to most players. Such games also represent a high risk to investors as their revenues can be difficult to predict. However, limited successes of some games, such as Axie Infinity during the COVID-19 pandemic, and increasing corporate interest in metaverse content, refueled interest in the area of GameFi—a term describing the intersection of video games and financing, typically backed by blockchain currency—in the second half of 2021. By the end of 2021, several major publishers, including Ubisoft, Electronic Arts, Take Two Interactive, and Square Enix, stated that blockchain and NFT-based games were under serious consideration for their companies in the future.

In October 2021, Valve Corporation banned blockchain games, including those using cryptocurrency and NFTs, from being hosted on its Steam digital storefront service, which is widely used for personal computer gaming. The company said this was an extension of their policy banning games that offer in-game items with real-world value. Valve's prior history with gambling, specifically skin gambling, was speculated to be a factor in the decision to ban blockchain games. Valve's CEO Gabe Newell explained in a later interview that while he believed blockchain technology was legitimate, the company felt there were too many bad actors in the market at the time to allow cryptocurrency or NFTs onto Steam. Newell said, "The ways in which it has been utilised are currently all pretty sketchy. And you sort of want to stay away from that." Journalists and players responded positively to Valve's decision, as blockchain and NFT games have a reputation for scams and fraud among most PC gamers, while blockchain game publishers and developers urged Valve to reconsider their position. Epic Games's CEO Tim Sweeney said in the wake of Valve's refusal that the Epic Games Store would be open to accepting blockchain games which followed relevant laws and regulations, although Sweeney noted that Epic did not use such technology at the time.

In December 2021, Ubisoft announced the Ubisoft Quartz program, based on the proof of stake Tezos cryptocurrency, which Ubisoft claimed was more energy efficient. Quartz allows players to purchase and sell "Digits", which are in-game character customization items. The service launched with items in Tom Clancy's Ghost Recon Breakpoint. On the same day, Ars Technica stated that "Ubisoft's... plans make no sense" because the Quartz system is so deeply controlled by Ubisoft that a simple conventional internal database would achieve the same result without the overhead of a blockchain. Users criticized the technology because Ubisoft terms of service state that the company has "no liability" for claims or damages and is aware that the blockchain "may be subject to specific weaknesses, which make them possibly targets for specific cybersecurity threats" and disclaim "liability in the risks implied by the use of this new technology." On 9 December, Ubisoft de-listed the announcement video on YouTube, following viewer backlash and dislike bombing. French trade union Solidaires Informatique criticized Ubisoft's plan for Quartz, stating that blockchain technology is "harmful, worthless, and without future", and that it is "a useless, costly, ecologically mortifying tech which doesn't bring anything to videogames". After their initial release, trade volume for Digits was virtually zero in the following weeks. Players who used them complained that no one noticed the Digits during multiplayer matches. Ubisoft released the last Digit for Ghost Recon Breakpoint on 17 March 2022 and ended support for the game shortly thereafter.

In December 2021, Peter Molyneux announced that his development studio 22cans's planned business simulation game Legacy would include a cryptocurrency called "LegacyCoin", based on the Ethereum blockchain. Prior to release, speculators could purchase in-game items as NFTs, and sales reached $50 million within a few days of Molyneux's announcement. That same month, GSC Game World announced plans to include NFTs in the game S.T.A.L.K.E.R. 2. Due to widespread complaints, a day later the studio announced that they would no longer be pursuing NFTs within the game.

In February 2022, games marketplace Itch.io described NFTs and blockchain games as a "scam", and said that anyone who thought they were useful should "reevaluate your life choices". This announcement was partly in response to an unconfirmed rumor that online publishing platform Gumroad would become involved with NFTs, which was met with widespread backlash from users.

In July 2022, Mojang Studios announced that NFTs would not be permitted in Minecraft, saying that "speculative pricing and investment mentality around NFTs takes the focus away from playing the game and encourages profiteering, which we think is inconsistent with the long-term joy and success of our players".

Will Wright revealed in October 2022 that his upcoming game VoxVerse would be a blockchain enabled game. The game's blockchain features were inspired by Wright having seen players in The Sims create their own assets and distribute them to others; within VoxVerse, creator players will be able to make areas that other players can explore and interact in, and then trade and sell these assets as NFTs.

Square Enix committed more to blockchain game support, intending to bring the technology to the Final Fantasy series and also announcing new IP named Symbiogenesis built around NFTs. In a November 2022 investors report, the company said that they consider blockchain technology critical to their growth. Although several other companies had distanced themselves from blockchain and NFT technology following widespread consumer backlash, as of April 2023, Square Enix had reaffirmed its commitment to the technology. In February 2025, Square Enix announced it would be ending support for the Symbiogenesis game.

== Reception and criticism ==
Xbox head executive Phil Spencer said in regards to blockchain games "that some of the creative that I see today feels more exploitative than about entertainment". When the gaming communication platform Discord suggested possible Ethereum integration into their client in November 2021, users criticized the inclusion of cryptocurrency and Discord backed off, affirming they had no set plans for its inclusion.

MMO developer Damion Schubert argued that most pitches for games for NFTs could also be achieved without the use of NFTs and that the non-NFT options would be easier to implement.

In November 2021 Rob Fahy wrote in Gameindustry.biz that the "play-to-earn" business model is similar to earlier systems that encouraged the rise of gold farming which later led developers to shift to selling "gold" to players directly in real currency. He argued that the business model could potentially reintroduce artificial scarcity of in-game currency and in-game items or characters, and that in-game marketplaces will likely have a payment system where a game developer takes a cut when players sell a marketplace item to each other.

In December 2021, during The Game Awards, Josef Fares, director of It Takes Two, stated that he would rather get "shot in the knee" than include NFTs in any of his games.

Games journalist Jason Schreier characterised the blockchain "play-to-earn" model as a pyramid scheme. Competing developers of "step-to-earn" games—fitness games that reward cryptocurrency for walking—rushed to accuse each other of being Ponzi schemes while simultaneously working toward "solutions to their Ponzinomics problem". One developer, StepN, admitted that play-to-earn games require a constant supply of new players or else their token economy would collapse.

The Game Developers Conference's 2022 annual report stated that 70% of developers surveyed said their studios had no interest in NFTs, while 28% said they were very or somewhat interested in them, and only 1% said they were integrating them into their games. In addition 72% of developers said they were not interested in cryptocurrency as a payment tool for games, while 27% said they were very or somewhat interested, and only 1% saying they were already doing so.

Square Enix's new year letter, which expressed interest in NFTs in video games, received heavy backlash from fans, with many additionally expressing disdain at the letter's comparison of "play to have fun" and "play to contribute" players.

== List of blockchain games ==
- Axie Infinity
- CryptoKitties
- Crypto: The Game
- Flappy Bird (2024)
- MapleStory Universe (MapleStory N)
- The Sandbox (2021)
- Off the Grid
- Might and Magic: Fates

=== Discontinued games ===
- Tom Clancy's Ghost Recon Breakpoint - Released in 2019 as a non-blockchain game. In 2022, developer Ubisoft added support for Ubisoft Quartz NFTs. Live support for the game was ended four months later.
- Champions Tactics: Grimoria Chronicles - Launched in October 2024. Ubisoft re-released the game as Champions Tactics: Reforged without blockchain integration.
- Symbiogenesis - Launched in December 2023. Square Enix shut down the servers on July 31, 2025.
- Captain Tsubasa Rivals - Licensed from the Captain Tsubasa manga series. KLab Inc. ended support on November 28, 2025.
- The Walking Dead: Empires - Licensed from The Walking Dead franchise. Gala Games shut down the servers on July 31, 2025.

== See also ==
- Web3
