= Alpha Kimori =

- Genre: Role-playing
- Developer: Sherman3D
- Publisher: Sherman3D
- Creator: Sherman Chin
- Platform: Microsoft Windows
- First release: Great Doubt; March 24, 2011

Alpha Kimori is a trilogy of episodic sprite-based role-playing video games. Its art style is anime-inspired. It markets itself as having a highly philosophical plot combined with a traditional Japanese RPG turn-based battle system. Alpha Kimori is independently developed by Sherman Chin and Sherman3D. It was produced using the RPG Maker engine.

== Alpha Kimori Great Doubt ==
Alpha Kimori Great Doubt Episode One is the first of the trilogy of Alpha Kimori Role Playing Games and is a mix between science fiction and fantasy. The game differentiates itself based on character development in the JRPG type linear storyline. Great Doubt is named after the underlying Great Doubt philosophy which is inspired by the Japanese Zen and Chinese Tao philosophies. The story is arguably a metaphor for current real-world events. It tells of two opposing forces of Yin and Yang. Both forces are dependent on each other and the good and evil sides are not clearly defined. The story is presented with simple 2D graphics.

=== Plot ===
Alpha Kimori's story takes place 50 years after the alien invasion of Earth. The newly discovered planet Kimori plays host to two warring human factions – the Bidarians, who want to reclaim Earth, and the Jinrians, who are contented with their new home. The Bidarians are equipped with Robotic Intelligent Cybernetic Armor (RICA) technology while the Jinrians have the ability to transmute into colossal indigenous creatures. Despite the technological background story, the core is about a young Bidarian warrior, Rick, who falls in love with Jinrian princess, Yuki.

=== Characters ===
- Rick Brightheart

Rick is a Bidarian warrior who is coming into age. As a Kimorian enhanced human, the Elders expect Rick to perform and he also faces tremendous pressure from his prominent parents in the Bidarian army. Rick is skilled but his childhood memories of a girl with wings, prompting him to swear off violence, continue to haunt him. (Rick holds the God Angel Ki Crystal.)

- Vanessa Avery

Vanessa is a warrior of Bidari who is a loyal childhood friend to Rick. She is an extremely gifted student and her sense of pride has earned her the reputation of a diva. Nevertheless, she is willing to make sacrifices because of her affection for Rick. To her utter dismay, Rick seems oblivious to her advances and views her as his sister. (Vanessa holds the Metal Angel Ki Crystal.)

- Yuki Furikai

Yuki is a princess from Jinri adopted by Lord Magnus. Her actual origin is a mystery and so are her angelic wings. Yuki is usually on the front lines, holding her own as a martial artist of the highest caliber. Yuki is often too idealistic and would not openly admit her feelings for Rick, preferring instead to blame him for her grievances. (Yuki holds the Arch Angel Ki Crystal)

- Elder Evlar

Evlar is a human Elder of the Bidarian High Council. Unlike the rest of the Elders, Evlar is particularly fond of Kimorians and does not treat them as mere servants or fighting machines. He has a close relationship with Rick and knows more about Kimori's history than he is letting on. Ultimately, he has his own agenda and is not about to be manipulated by anyone. (In the 2nd episode, he connects the Wood Angel Ki Crystal to his belt.)

- Daygan Whitaker

Daygan is a Bidarian warrior whose noble heart is often overshadowed by his self-created rivalry with Rick. In actual fact, he is envious of Vanessa's affection for Rick. Daygan appears to be a big bully but he is not very confident deep down inside. His demeanor is simply a facade in an attempt to grasp at some form of control over his environment. (Daygan holds the Fire Angel Ki Crystal.)

(Following characters are introduced in the 2nd episode)

- Emelyn Lee

Emelyn is the courageous but brash leader of Tana. She has a personal vendetta against the Bidarian Elders who tried to kill her in an attempt to harness her Ki Crystal. Her thirst for vengeance stops for no one except her beloved little brother, Ken. She has little need for words and is precise in her execution. (Emelyn holds the Water Angel Ki Crystal)

- Ken Lee

Ken possesses intelligence and wisdom beyond his years. He always seeks mutually beneficial solutions. In times of need, he can be counted on to calm his sister and to determine the best course of action. Despite his mental prowess, Ken suffers from an emotional weakness for Miyu of whom he admires greatly. (Ken holds the Earth Angel Ki Crystal)

- Miyu Myu

Miyu is a half feline mutant who is supposedly a failed combination of Kimorians and Jinrian transmutations. Being the Karyian leader's younger sister, she partakes in dangerous missions. Miyu is resourceful and makes the best of her situation. She might act cute and funny at times.

=== Theme song ===
The Alpha Kimori theme song features vocals from the Hatsune Miku software and was written and recorded by Japanese composer Yossy.

=== Game trailer ===
The Alpha Kimori trailer featured the theme song sung by Hatsune Miku and 3D models of the game characters.

=== History ===
- 2011 Mar 24 | Alpha Kimori Episode One was released as a one-week exclusive on Big Fish Games.
- 2011 Apr 7 | Alpha Kimori Episode One was released on the official http://www.AlphaKimori.com website.
- 2011 May 31 | In the first official review of Alpha Kimori, Gamezebo gave it a rating of 4 out of 5 stars noting that "Alpha Kimori: Great Doubt is an excellent, thought-provoking RPG."
- 2011 Oct 26 | Alpha Kimori was reviewed by RPGFan noting that "Sherman3D created a brightly futuristic world with a style all its own that stands out from the pack."
- 2011 Oct 26 | Alpha Kimori was featured in the AnimationXpress Asia Pacific news portal.
- 2011 Oct 31 | Alpha Kimori and its creators, Sherman Chin and Tiffany Lim, were featured on the cover and center spread of the New Straits Times newspaper's Tech pullout.
- 2011 Nov 11 | An Alpha Kimori Episode One 200-page Official Strategy Guide was created for fans and announced on Gamasutra.
- 2011 Nov 25 | Spinoff games based on the Alpha Kimori intellectual property was announced on Gamasutra.
- 2012 May 17 | Alpha Kimori Great Doubt Episode Two Exclusive Edition was released on Sherman3D's website on May 17, 2012.
- 2012 Jun 6 | In the review of Alpha Kimori Great Doubt Episode Two, Gamezebo gave it a rating of 4 out of 5 stars noting that "Alpha Kimori Episode 2 is an excellent continuation of the series."
- 2012 Jul 12 | Sherman3D's co-founder, Tiffany Lim, was interviewed by Casual Connect Association for the Casual Connect magazine.
- 2012 Jul 17 | In the review of Alpha Kimori Great Doubt Episode Two, RPGFan gave it a rating of 84% noting that it is "one of the more professional-looking and aesthetically polished RPG Maker games I've seen."
- 2012 Aug 31 |Alpha Kimori was put up on Valve's Steam Greenlight and was featured on Tech in Asia and Gamezebo.
- 2012 Sep 9 | Alpha Kimori Great Doubt Episode One Exclusive Edition was released on Sherman3D's website.
- 2012 Sep 11 | In the review of Alpha Kimori Great Doubt Episode One, Operation Rainfall gave it a rating of 4 out of 5 stars noting that "Alpha Kimori is a great indie RPG that starts out simply enough, but provides surprising depth in its themes and story."
- 2012 Sep 20 | Alpha Kimori was showcased at the Tokyo Game Show in Japan on September 20 and 21, 2012 and was praised by the Japanese media as a tribute to classic Japanese role-playing games.
- 2012 Dec 12 | Alpha Kimori Episode Two strategy guide was released.
- 2013 Mar 7 | Alpha Kimori Episode Two was released as a one-week exclusive on Big Fish Games.
- 2013 May 21 | Alpha Kimori JRPG and Philosophy lecture by Sherman Chin at Casual Connect Asia in Singapore at the Tower Ballroom of Shangri-la Hotel.
- 2014 March 17 | Alpha Kimori launches on Valve's Steam after being Greenlit.
- 2014 April 1 | Alpha Kimori launches on Big Fish Games Japan.
- 2014 May 12 | Alpha Kimori with Sherman Chin GameRamble interview.
- 2014 June 17 | Alpha Kimori sold over 29,000 copies in the Groupees Be Mine 13 Game and Charity Bundle sponsored by Machinima.
- 2014 December 25 | Alpha Kimori sold 31,657 copies in the Humble Weekly Bundle: RPG Edition Book 1 Bundle.
