= Flappy Bird (2024 video game) =

- Official logo
- Developer: Gametech Holdings
- Publisher: Gametech Holdings
- Director: Michael Roberts
- Platforms: iOS, Android, web browser
- Release: Telegram; September 2024; iOS, Android; 2025
- Genre: Arcade
- Modes: Single-player, multiplayer

Flappy Bird is a 2024 arcade mobile game developed by Gametech Holdings, under the name "The Flappy Bird Foundation". The game was announced on September 12, 2024, as an unofficial reboot of the original game. The company acquired the trademark in January 2024 in a lawsuit against the game's original developer. The game is hosted on a blockchain and includes its own cryptocurrency.

== Gameplay ==
Similar to the original game, Flappy Bird controls a bird character, which moves persistently to the right. The player is tasked with navigating the bird through pairs of pipes that have equally sized gaps placed at random heights. The bird automatically descends and only ascends when the player taps the touchscreen. The game also has other game modes, including a "rivals" mode where 100 players compete against each other.

== Development ==
On January 12, 2024, the trademark for Flappy Bird was terminated after Gametech Holdings had filed to have it recognized as abandoned, with Dong Nguyen, the original developer of Flappy Bird, failing to reclaim it. In addition, the rights to Piou Piou vs. Cactus were acquired by Gametech, alongside employing its developer, Kek, who claims the acquiring to be "a milestone not just in gaming but for [him] personally".

Gametech, under the name "The Flappy Bird Foundation", announced the reboot on September 12, more than ten years after Flappy Bird's discontinuation, showcasing additional features and characters. The game was initially released exclusively on Telegram in September 2024, with iOS and Android released in 2025. The game is open source, built on the blockchain platform Solana and includes a cryptocurrency named the "Flap Token". Prior to its release, a version of the game built on The Open Network was released to allow users to participate in the "Flap-a-TON" event.

== Reception ==
Upon its unveiling, Flappy Bird was met with generally negative reactions, especially in regards to users on X (formerly Twitter) pointing out its involvement with cryptocurrency and Gametech's acquiring of the trademark. Dong Nguyen, the developer of the original Flappy Bird, affirmed his lack of involvement with the sequel, as well as stating that he did not sell the rights to his game, nor does he support crypto. In a response, the developers claimed that the game would not feature non-fungible tokens, and that all "Web3 features" would be optional.

Lance Ulanoff of TechRadar criticized Flappy Bird's attempts at recreating the original release, claiming that it "bear[s] little resemblance to the originals but [does] have just enough to trigger that other simian response: nostalgia." Rich Stanton of PC Gamer, while indecisive on the trademark acquiring, states that "there's a small bit of [him] that wants to see [Flappy Bird] smash straight into a pipe."
