= Unyte =

Web conferencing company

IBM Lotus Sametime Unyte
- Headquarters: Westford, MA United States
- Services: IBM Lotus Sametime Unyte Meeting, IBM Lotus Sametime Unyte Events, IBM Lotus Sametime Unyte Share
- Website: sametimeunyte.com

IBM Lotus Sametime Unyte is a family of Web-delivered, Web conferencing and online collaboration services provided by IBM. Its remote services include Lotus Sametime Unyte Share, Lotus Sametime Unyte Meeting and Lotus Sametime Unyte Events.

Lotus Sametime Unyte Meeting and Events are also offered as part of LotusLive.

== History ==
WebDialogs, Inc. was founded in 1998. In August 2007, it was acquired by the Lotus division of the IBM Corporation, and its product line was renamed IBM Lotus Sametime Unyte.

As of November 2009, the Lotus Sametime Unyte Share service is in the process of being discontinued as part of an IBM business decision. All of the Lotus Sametime Unyte services are in the process of being re-branded under the IBM Lotus brand called LotusLive. Current Unyte Share account subscriptions will be honored until that subscription expires. However no new Unyte Share accounts or upgrades to current accounts are being accepted.

== Services ==
Lotus Sametime Unyte integrates Web, audio and video conferencing for online Web meetings.

Lotus Sametime Unyte Meeting
The IBM Lotus Sametime Unyte Meeting service provides integrated Web, audio, and video conferencing services for up to 1,000 participants. Meetings can be recorded and are available for instance replay. Lotus Sametime Unyte Meeting is available as a hosted service and licensed software, as well as for resale by agents.

Lotus Sametime Unyte Events
Lotus Sametime Unyte Events is an event management service with the following capabilities: event registration, promotion, online meeting service, post-event follow up, tracking and analysis.

Lotus Sametime Unyte Share
Lotus Sametime Unyte Share is a no-charge, one-on-one desktop application sharing service.

The Lotus Sametime Unyte service offers its conferencing and collaboration technologies, both as hosted services and licensed software, to communication equipment providers, conferencing providers, application vendors and other resellers. Business partners receive client and server-side APIs, private label branding and product customization options.
