= Crypto: The Game =

Cryptocurrency-themed game

- Publisher: Uniswap
- Writers: Dylan Abruscato; Tyler Cagle; Bryan Lee
- Platform: Browser-based
- Release: January 2024

Crypto: The Game is a browser-based interactive survival game that combines blockchain mechanics with multiplayer elimination challenges.

== Description ==
Players pay an entry fee of 0.1 ETH (approximately $200) and are placed into one of ten tribes. Each day, tribes compete in browser-based minigames including Flappy Bird-style arcade games, digital scavenger hunts, and logic puzzles. The losing tribes must vote to eliminate players. Midway through the season, the tribes merge and players compete individually. A jury of eliminated contestants selects the winner at the end.

The game has been compared to reality competition shows such as Survivor, Squid Game, and The Traitors, and to The Hunger Games. In an interview, Abruscato said the founders "all loved Survivor growing up or we're Survivor super fans."

== History ==
Crypto: The Game was created by Dylan Abruscato, Tyler Cagle, and Bryan Lee, and launched in January 2024 with 410 players paying a cryptocurrency entry fee.

The second season, "Anon Island", premiered in April 2024, adding NFT-based anonymous entries and a prize pool of 80 ETH (approximately $140,000 at the time). Crypto: The Game partnered with Adidas, which created co-branded tracksuits for contestants. Axios reported that the partnership had "little fanfare" on Adidas' part. Cryptocurrency companies Uniswap, Lens, Wormhole, POAP, and Safe sponsored in-game challenges. In June 2024, Uniswap acquired the project in a deal involving cash, tokens, and equity. The second season was sold out in 13 minutes. The third season, "Resurrection Island", debuted in March 2025 with 716 players. It introduced a twist that allowed eliminated contestants to return through special challenges. Across all three seasons, the format remained largely consistent, with daily challenges, nightly eliminations, and a final jury vote to determine the winner.

A Wired reporter embedded anonymously in Season 3 and described the experience as socially complex and time-intensive. Crypto: The Game was submitted for consideration at the 77th Primetime Emmy Awards in the Outstanding Emerging Media Program category. Variety included it in its preview coverage as one of the standout entries in the emerging media category.
