= Andreas Hackethal =

Dean of the Goethe Business School and professor

Andreas Hackethal is a Professor of Finance and the Dean of the Goethe Business School at the Goethe University Frankfurt.

== Life ==
Andreas Hackethal earned his degrees in Business Administration from Goethe University Frankfurt and the University of Iowa. He finished his doctoral studies at Goethe University in 1999 and received his postdoctoral lecture qualification (Habilitation) from Goethe University in 2005. Parallel to his academic career he spent two years in banking and eight years in strategy consulting. From 2005 to 2007 he held a position as Finance Professor and was head of Finance Department at European Business School in Oestrich-Winkel, Germany.

In 2008 he joined Goethe University in Frankfurt as a tenured Professor of Finance. From 2008 to 2011 he served as the dean of Goethe Business School, the center for high-quality management education at Goethe University. Since October 2011, he is the Dean of the Faculty of Economics and Business Administration at Goethe University.

His research fields are personal finance and empirical banking. He directs the Retail Banking Competence Center at Goethe University and he is one of the directors of the Frankfurt and Darmstadt-based E-Finance Lab.

Since 2009, he is a member of the advisory council of the German Financial Services Authority BaFin and since late 2011 he is also a member of the Exchance Experts Commission which advises the German Federal Ministry of Finance.

In 2010 he won the award "German Professor of the Year 2010" by the student magazine "unicum Beruf" for commitment to student careers.

== Selected publications ==
- Is Unbiased Financial Advice to Retail Investors Sufficient? Answers from a Large Field Study. (with Bhattacharya, U., Kaesler, S., Loos, B., Meyer, S.), Review of Financial Studies, 2012
- Financial Advice: A Case of Babysitters. (with Haliassos, M. and Japelli, T.), Journal of Banking and Finance, 2011
- The Anatomy of Bank Diversification. (with Ralf Elsas and Markus Holzhäuser), Journal of Banking and Finance, 2010.
- Corporate Governance in Germany: Transition to a Modern Capital Market-Based System? (with R.H. Schmidt, M. Tyrell), Journal of *Institutional and Theoretical Economics (JITE), 2003
- Disintermediation and the Role of Banks in Europe: An International Comparison (with R.H. Schmidt, M. Tyrell), Journal of Financial Intermediation, 1999
