= The Sandbox (2012 video game) =

2012 video game

- Developer: Pixowl
- Publisher: Pixowl
- Platforms: iOS, Android, Windows
- Release: May 15, 2012
- Genre: Sandbox game
- Mode: Single-player

The Sandbox is a 2D sandbox game for mobile phones (iOS and Android) and Microsoft Windows, developed by the game studio Pixowl and released on May 15, 2012. It was released for PC on Steam on June 19, 2015.

A sequel, The Sandbox Evolution, was later released on the same platforms.

The brand was acquired by Animoca Brands in 2018, and its name was used for a blockchain-based 3D open world game of the same name that launched on November 29, 2021.

== Gameplay ==
The player takes the role of "Deity apprentice" and sets about crafting their own universe through the exploration of resources such as water, soil, lightning, lava, sand and glass. The user is given a single 2D screen as their canvas, and applies these resources as pixels. Once added to the screen, these resources interact in various ways, such as water mixing with sand to create mud, and lava burning other objects.

The game also includes more complex elements such as humans, wildlife, and mechanical contraptions. The player is given challenges like making a battery or building an electrical circuit. Players can save worlds they have created and also upload them to a public gallery.

The game is free to play, with microtransactions required to unlock additional building elements.

== Reception ==
The 2015 edition of the game has a Metacritic score of 85% based on 7 critic reviews.
