= DLsite =

Japanese media distributor platform

- Available in: Japanese; English; simplified Chinese; traditional Chinese; Korean; Spanish; German; French; Indonesian; Italian; Portuguese; Swedish; Thai; Vietnamese
- Owners: EISYS, Inc. (株式会社エイシス)
- Founder: Aoki System Co. Ltd. (有限会社アオキシステム)
- Website: www.dlsite.com
- Launched: July 1996

DLsite (Japanese: ディーエルサイト), operated by the Japanese company EISYS, Inc. (Japanese: 株式会社エイシス), is an ecommerce storefront website and digital distribution service for downloading and selling a mixture of all-ages and adults-only doujinshi, doujin games, digital manga, light novel e-books, software, computer games, Android apps, and similar goods. As of 2022, DLsite had reached over 9 million global users. The service adapted its current name in January 2019.

== History ==
DLsite was established by Aoki System Co., Ltd. in July 1996 under the name "Soft Island" (ソフトアイランド). After Aoki System was renamed as EISYS, Inc., the site's name changed to DLsite.com (ディーエルサイトコム) in January 2001. In March 2003, DLsite partnered with Digital Media Mart (currently DMM.com) to create the doujin section of DMM.ADULT (predecessor of FANZA), which ended in August 2005. In January 2004, the website was refreshed and it released the English language version of the site. In January 2005, EISYS became a subsidiary of Livedoor Co., Ltd. By April 2010, the number of registered circles exceeded 10,000.

In May 2010, Livedoor spun off EISYS and, in turn, DLsite, which became a subsidiary of Geo Corporation. In May 2011, the website was refreshed again, and some categories were removed or reorganized. In February 2018, DLSite announced that it would start publishing games on Steam and would start a translation service business. "DLsite.com" became simply "DLsite" in January 2019.

On 11 May 2023, DLsite issued a temporary restriction on publishing AI-generated content. On 15 February 2024, DLsite announced the platform renewed the guideline of selling AI-generated content, opened a new space for selling AI contents, and lifted the restriction issued before.

In March 2024, some creators reported that DLsite ordered them to change the description of their works to comply with policies from credit card companies. For example, altering the word loli (ロリ, Loli) into hiyoko (ひよこ, Hiyoko; lit. 'chick'). In April 2024, EISYS announced that all their platforms have suspended credit card payments from Visa, Mastercard, and American Express.

== Translators Unite ==
In November 2021, EISYS and DLSite announced a service called Translators Unite. This service aims to allow DLsite to crowd-source translations for its materials in a way that directly supports creators in exchange for residuals or commission. This is also intended to redirect the enthusiasm for online scanlation towards legal distribution. Manga translation work is accomplished through a tool called the MANTRA Engine, which is also partnering with Pixiv-FANBOX.

In 2023, DLsite added support for nine more languages, bringing the total to fourteen supported languages.

== See also ==
- Doujinshi
- DMM.com
- Pixiv
