= OpenSea =

American digital asset platform

- Type: Private
- Founded: 2017; 9 years ago
- Headquarters: Miami, United States
- Area served: Worldwide
- Key people: Devin Finzer (CEO); Chris Maddern (CTO)
- Website: opensea.io

OpenSea is an American digital asset platform founded in 2017 by Devin Finzer and Alex Atallah. It facilitates the trading of cryptocurrencies and the buying, selling, and minting of non-fungible tokens (NFTs) across a range of blockchains. Headquartered in Miami, OpenSea supports fixed-price sales and auctions for digital assets including artwork, music, gaming items, and domain names.

Originally launched as a peer-to-peer platform, OpenSea grew into one of the largest NFT marketplaces, further expanding with its 2025 release of OS2, a rebuilt version of the platform, allowing the trading of cryptocurrencies.

== History ==
=== Founding and initial growth (2017–2021) ===
Devin Finzer and Alex Atallah founded OpenSea in December 2017. They were inspired by CryptoKitties, a blockchain-based game featuring non-fungible tokens that had been released earlier that year. Y Combinator accepted OpenSea into its accelerator program in 2018. After finishing the pre-seed round by Y Combinator, OpenSea raised $2.1 million in venture capital in November 2019.

In March 2020, the platform had 4,000 active users completing $1.1 million in transactions a month. In March 2021, OpenSea raised 23 million in Series A funding through Andreessen Horowitz, among other investors. By July 2021, users were completing $350 million in transactions a month, and the company was valued at $1.5 billion—meaning unicorn status—after a $100 million Series B venture round led by Andreessen Horowitz. In August 2021, the value of monthly transactions spiked to $3.4 billion, and in November OpenSea had 1.8 million active users.

In November 2021, OpenSea partnered with Vogue Singapore to release an NFT collection for the brand. The collection included two covers of magazines from September 2021 and other pieces of artwork from related artists. A month later, in December 2021, OpenSea partnered with Billboard and Autograph, the NFT platform co-founded by Tom Brady, to auction The Weeknd’s “Blinding Lights” NFT collection, commemorating the song’s record-breaking performance on the Billboard Hot 100. Also in that month, OpenSea entered into a partnership with Christie's to conduct auctions of NFTs on the blockchain. The collaboration's first sale featured works by artists including Andre O'Shea, Recur, Oseanworld, GMUNK, and Ash Thorp.

=== Growth and acquisitions (2022–2025) ===
In early January 2022, OpenSea raised an additional $300 million in Series C funding through Paradigm and Coatue Management, among other investors. The company was valued at $13.3 billion. Later that month, OpenSea acquired Ethereum wallet-maker Dharma Labs.

Towards the end of January, OpenSea reimbursed users about $1.8 million after a user interface bug allowed users to buy more than $1 million worth of NFTs at a discount.

On February 19, 2022, some users began to report that some of their NFTs disappeared. OpenSea later revealed a phishing attack had taken place on its platform via an exploit in the Wyvern Platform. The next day, The Verge reported that hundreds of NFTs were stolen from OpenSea users causing a huge panic among the platform community. The estimated value of the stolen tokens was more than $1.7 million. According to OpenSea, only 32 users had been affected. OpenSea later revised its statement to note that 17 users were directly affected, while the other 15 users had interacted with the attacker but had not lost tokens as a result.

In March 2022, OpenSea confirmed that it was blocking accounts in countries that are subject to United States sanctions.

On April 25, 2022, OpenSea announced the acquisition of the NFT marketplace aggregator company Gem.xyz.

The daily trading volume on the OpenSea marketplace reached a peak of $2.7 billion on May 1, 2022, but had dropped by 99%, to just $9.34 million on August 28, with daily users down to 24,020.

On June 30, 2022, OpenSea reported an email data breach after a senior engineer at an email vendor, Customer.io, misused access to share 1.8 million OpenSea user email addresses with an "external bad actor."

On July 14, 2022, the company laid off approximately twenty percent of its employees.

In August 2024, the Securities and Exchange Commission (SEC) issued a Wells notice to OpenSea, alleging that the tokens on the platform were unregistered securities, according to a post made on X by chief executive officer Devin Finzer. Following the SEC Wells notice issuing, OpenSea pledged $5 million to Stand With Crypto, a nonprofit spun off from Coinbase, which set up an initial $6 million fund to help non-fungible token creators and artists cover potential legal costs. In February 2025, the SEC, which at the time was led by Mark Uyeda, dropped its case, closing the investigation. In response, Finzer stated, "This outcome allows creators to continue shaping the future of digital ownership and innovation".

=== OS2, platform redevelopment (2025–present) ===
In 2025, OpenSea launched OS2, a platform overhaul supporting token and NFT trading across 22 blockchains. The interface improved search capabilities, aggregated marketplace listings, cross-chain purchasing, lower fees, and a gamified rewards system called Voyages. Beginning in July 2025, OpenSea allowed users to trade cryptocurrencies directly on its platform. Finzer credited his wife, Yu-Chi Lyra Kuo, with having the idea to expand OpenSea into a crypto-trading application, and considered her to be "a silent cofounder of OpenSea 2.0".

In July 2025, OpenSea acquired Rally, a Web3 crypto wallet and NFT trading application. In that same month, charges against former OpenSea head of product Nate Chastain were overturned. He had previously been convicted in May 2023 of wire fraud and money laundering, having been sentenced to three months in prison after being accused of insider trading in September 2021.

In September 2025, OpenSea announced plans to spend more than $1 million building a "Flagship Collection" of NFTs, beginning with the acquisition of a CryptoPunk. The works were to be selected by a group of OpenSea staff and external art advisors, with the goal of including culturally significant pieces and highlighting emerging digital artists.

Through the first two weeks of October 2025, following the release of OS2, OpenSea processed $1.6 billion in cryptocurrency trades and $230 million in NFT transactions.

In November 2025, Finzer was interviewed by Bloomberg Crypto, speaking on the "tokenization of everything" and OpenSea's expansion beyond NFTs.

In December 2025, OpenSea was an official partner of Art Basel Miami Beach, sponsoring a curated section of digital art titled Zero 10. The section was curated by Eli Scheinman, and featured multiple exhibitors, including Beeple and his installation, Regular Animals, which displayed humanoid robots with hyper-realistic heads of prominent individuals in tech and art, like Mark Zuckerberg, Elon Musk, and Picasso.

=== Features ===
In December 2020, OpenSea announced that any user could mint NFTs on its platform for free. Later, in March 2021, OpenSea announced NFT collections would not need to be approved to be listed. On January 27, 2022, OpenSea moved to limit its free minting tool over theft, plagiarism, and spam concerns (80% of removed NFTs used it), but reversed the decision the next day.

On September 17, 2021, OpenSea released an app for Android and iOS. The app allows for browsing the marketplace, but as of March 2023, the app does not allow buying or selling NFTs.

Upon the release of OS2 in 2025, OpenSea enabled token trading across multiple blockchains. While the company does not follow know your customer guidelines, it does use TRM Labs to cross-reference user wallets against lists of sanctioned addresses, flagging potentially suspicious activities for money laundering.
