= Polygon (blockchain) =

Blockchain and cryptocurrency

- Icon of Polygon

Denominations
- Code: POL
- Previous names: MATIC

Development
- Original author(s): Jaynti Kanani, Sandeep Nailwal, Mihailo Bjelic, Anurag Arjun
- White paper: polygon.technology/papers/pol-whitepaper
- Code repository: github.com/maticnetwork/
- Development status: Active
- Developer: Polygon Labs
- Source model: Open source

Ledger
- Ledger start: June 1, 2020; 6 years ago
- Issuance schedule: Yearly emission rate of 1% after 10 years
- Block time: 2.3 seconds
- Block explorer: polygonscan.com/
- Circulating supply: 10,000,000,000

Website
- Website: polygon.technology/

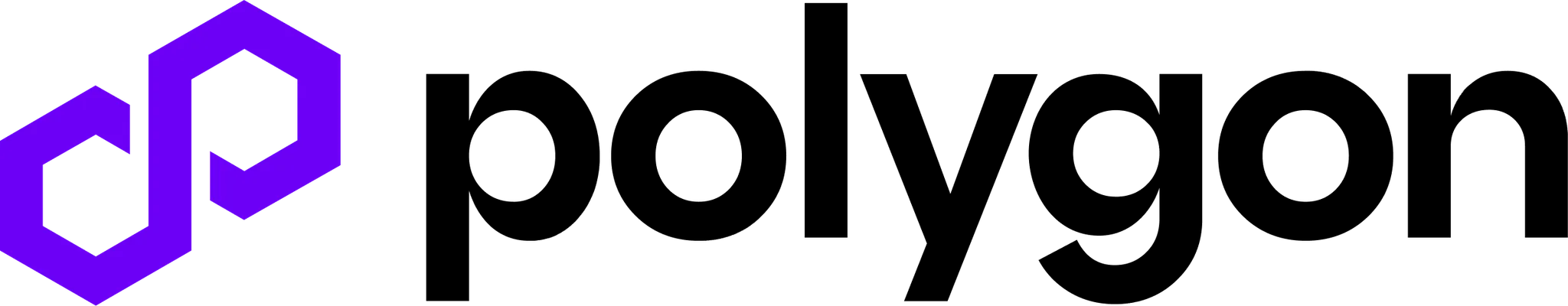
Polygon crypto logo

Polygon (formerly Matic Network) is a blockchain platform which aims to create a multi-chain blockchain system compatible with Ethereum. As with Ethereum, it uses a proof-of-stake consensus mechanism for processing transactions on-chain. Polygon's native token is POL, an ERC-20 token which allows for compatibility with other Ethereum cryptocurrencies. It is operated by Polygon Labs.

Polygon is a natively Layer-2 network that uses Ethereum as a base network. In particular, transactions are first validated inside Polygon and then periodically committed in a "checkpoint": a Merkle root of transaction hashes is committed to Ethereum's mainnet by using "Core contracts".

Polygon runs various decentralized applications (dApps) such as Defi, DAOs, and NFTs.

== History ==
The blockchain company Polygon was originally known as Matic Network. The Matic Network was launched in 2017 by four software engineers: Jaynti Kanani, Sandeep Nailwal, Anurag Arjun, and Mihailo Bjelic. In February 2021, the project was rebranded as Polygon Technology.

In August 2021, Polygon acquired Hermez Network for $250 million. In December 2021, Polygon acquired the Mir blockchain network for 250 million MATIC tokens, with the tokens having a value of around $400 million at the time of the deal.

In December 2021, Polygon disclosed a security vulnerability that resulted in the theft of 801,601 MATIC tokens.

In February 2022, Polygon raised $450 million by selling MATIC tokens in a round led by Sequoia Capital India including Tiger Global and Softbank Vision Fund.

In November 2022, JPMorgan Chase executed its first live trade on a public blockchain, using Polygon and modified Aave.

On December 15, 2022, Donald Trump launched a series of digital art NFTs minted on the Polygon network for sale to the public for $99 USD each.

By February 2023, the blockchain was doing business with large companies such as Starbucks and Mastercard, with Fortune noting it had been relatively unaffected by the 2022 cryptocurrency crash compared to other companies. Starbucks later discontinued its Polygon-based NFT rewards program in March 2024. The Fox Network began working with Polygon on a blockchain project in 2023.

In January 2024, Polygon announced that its community had voted to fund a new "Community Treasury", with about $640 million worth of tokens to fund grants for projects within the Polygon ecosystem.

In February 2024 Polygon Labs laid off 60 employees, or around 19% of its staff.

== Technology ==
Polygon employs a modified proof-of-stake consensus technique, which allows consensus to be reached with every block on the blockchain. (Using standard proof-of-stake, achieving consensus will need processing a large number of blocks to establish consensus.) The proof of stake method requires network participants to stake—agree to not trade or sell—their POL tokens, in exchange for the right to validate Polygon network transactions. Successful validators in the Polygon network are rewarded with POL tokens proportionally to their POL stake. The Polygon network aims to address problems within the Ethereum platform, namely high transaction fees and slow processing speeds.

In January 2024, Polygon announced a new protocol called AggLayer that aims to aggregate zero-knowledge proofs (ZK-proofs) from multiple blockchains and allow developers to connect layer 1 and 2 blockchains to merge them into a single network.

== Partnerships ==
Polygon is the blockchain platform which runs Polymarket, the world's largest prediction market as of 2024.

In July 2022, Polygon participated in Disney's 2022 acceleration program to expand into augmented reality, NFTs, and AI.

In October 2022, the Indian Police in Firozabad started using Polygon for reporting crimes.

In January 2023, Polygon partnered with Alethea AI on an "AI Collectibles campaign" for trading AI characters as NFTs on Polygon.

In March 2023, Polygon partnered with Immutable Pty Ltd to integrate Polygon's zkEVM technology into Immutable's blockchain.

In April 2023, Polygon and Google Cloud formed a multi-year strategic alliance to accelerate the adoption of Polygon protocols, enhancing the development of Web3 products and decentralized applications.

In January 2025, Jio Platforms, the digital subsidiary of Reliance Industries (RIL) and the operator of Indian-based telecom network, Reliance Jio, confirmed a collaboration with blockchain firm Polygon Labs to integrate Web3 capabilities into its existing applications and services.
