= The Graph =

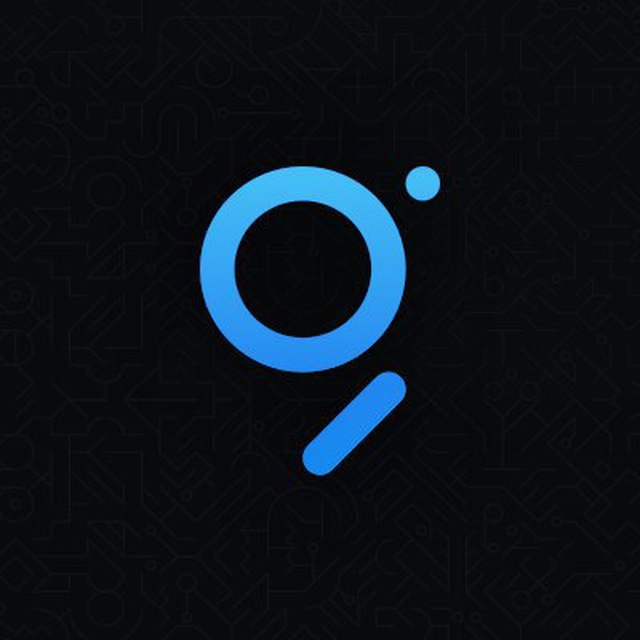

Denominations
- Code: $GRT

Development
- White paper: github.com/graphprotocol/research/blob/master/papers/whitepaper/the-graph-whitepaper.pdf
- Code repository: github.com/graphprotocol
- Development status: Active
- Developer(s): Yaniv Tal, Brandon Ramirez, and Jannis Pohlmann
- Source model: Open source

Ledger
- Block explorer: thegraph.com/explorer

Website
- Website: thegraph.com

The Graph is an open-source, decentralized protocol that powers the indexing and querying of blockchain data. It enables developers to build scalable web3 decentralized applications without managing complex indexing and querying infrastructure. It powers indexing, querying, real-time data streams, and analytics. The protocol is designed to support the growing infrastructure needs of web3, artificial intelligence (AI) agents, and dapps. With support for multiple networks, including Ethereum, Solana, Arbitrum, Base, BSC, and Polygon, The Graph is the industry standard for accessing blockchain data.

== Overview and Core Features ==
Often referred to as the "Google of blockchains," The Graph allows developers to create and query Subgraphs (open APIs) and Substreams (real-time data pipelines), and Token API (real-time token data) that deliver onchain data for application use.

The Graph provides a unified layer for accessing blockchain data through:

- Subgraphs: Custom APIs that define how blockchain data is structured, indexed, and retrieved.
- Substreams: High-performance streaming parallelized data pipelines that deliver real-time blockchain data.
- Token API: A ready-to-use API that delivers standardized token data such as balances, transfers, and metadata across chains, with no indexing required.

The Graph ecosystem supports developers building AI-powered dapps and intelligent, data-driven agents, reflecting its mission to advance autonomy and innovation in web3. Its decentralized architecture eliminates the need for centralized indexing servers, enabling composable, trustless data layers across blockchains.

== History ==
The Graph was launched in 2018 to address the need for reliable, accessible blockchain data. It was founded by Yaniv Tal, Brandon Ramirez, and Jannis Pohlmann. In its early years, the protocol focused on building indexing capabilities for Ethereum. Over time, it expanded to support multiple blockchain networks, including Solana, Arbitrum, Polygon, Optimism, and Base.

- In October 2025, Edge & Node, the core development team behind The Graph, announced ampersend, a platform designed to manage payments and policies for autonomous AI agents. It's built on Coinbase’s x402 protocol and Google’s agent-to-agent (A2A) framework, and developed in collaboration with Coinbase, Google, and the Ethereum Foundation’s decentralized AI team.
- In 2025, The Graph began the integration of Chainlink's Cross-Chain Interoperability Protocol (CCIP) to enable cross-chain transfer of GRT tokens across multiple blockchains including Solana, Arbitrum, and Base.
- In March 2025, The Graph released its Token API beta, enabling wallets, explorers, and dapps to query real-time token balances, transaction histories, and pricing data across multiple blockchains.
- In January 2025, The Graph launched Geo Genesis, an application allowing users and communities to curate, organize, and govern knowledge in web3 environments.
- In 2024, The Graph launched fast, no-code indexing for Solana, enabling developers to access on-chain data in hours instead of weeks, and eliminating the need for custom Rust code solutions.
- In 2024, The Graph completed its transition to a fully decentralized network, marking a significant shift from the hosted service to the decentralized protocol.

== Network Architecture ==
The native currency of The Graph is GRT, and its decentralized network is powered by multiple participant roles:

- Indexers: Operate nodes to index data and serve queries.
- Curators: Use GRT to signal on valuable subgraphs.
- Delegators: Stake GRT on Indexers to help support indexing and earn rewards.
- Consumers: dapps, AI agents, and other applications that pay GRT to access data.

Governance is managed by The Graph Foundation, and core development is led by teams such as Edge & Node, Geo, StreamingFast, Semiotic Labs, GraphOps, Pinax, and Wonderland,.

== Technology ==
=== Subgraphs ===
Subgraphs are the primary developer interface in The Graph. They are open APIs that define how blockchain data is indexed and queried. They can be deployed using Subgraph Studio.

=== Substreams ===
Substreams enable composable, customizable real-time indexing for high-throughput chains like Sonic. Substreams enhanced support for Solana development in 2024, introducing new tools that enable developers to access and synchronize blockchain data without writing Rust code. The improvements feature Substreams functionality with pre-built subgraphs from companies like Messari and Top Ledger, allowing developers to deploy projects fast.

=== Token API ===
The Graph's Token API Beta is designed for wallets, explorers, and decentralized applications that require fast and reliable token data for their frontends.

=== GRC-20 ===
In 2025, The Graph introduced GRC-20, a knowledge graph standard that enables structured, interoperable organization of decentralized data, similar to the ERC-20 standard.[8] Blockster described the introduction of the GRC-20 standard as “a step further by offering a unified framework that enhances interoperability, adaptability, and composability across decentralized applications.”

=== Geo Genesis ===
In January 2025, The Graph launched Geo Genesis, an application enabling users and communities to curate, organize, and govern knowledge in web3 environments using decentralized data infrastructure. The tool allows the creation of knowledge graphs to support AI development and improve data usability.

== Developer Support ==
=== Subgraph Studio ===
This is The Graph’s primary platform for creating, deploying, testing, and managing Subgraphs.

=== Sunrise Upgrade Program ===
In 2024, The Graph Foundation launched the Sunrise Upgrade Program, allocating up to 4 million GRT to support projects transitioning from centralized services to the decentralized network.

== Integrations ==
The Graph has integrated with a number of blockchain networks and infrastructure projects, including:

- TRON – integrated through Substreams provides developers with real-time access to onchain metrics and streaming data, which enables custom backend infrastructure and reduces development time from weeks to minutes.
- ApeChain, Metis, Sonic Labs – joined Subgraph Studio for improved developer tooling.
- Autonomys Network – introduced AutoEVM and AI indexing via The Graph infrastructure.

== Supported Networks ==
As of 2025, The Graph now supports a broad spectrum of blockchain networks, spanning both EVM-compatible and non-EVM ecosystems.

EVM-compatible Networks

Ethereum, Polygon, Arbitrum, Optimism, Avalanche, Base, Celo, BNB Chain, Aurora, Metis, ApeChain. See a list of all supported networks.

Non-EVM Networks

Solana, Near, Arweave, Stellar. See a list of all supported networks.

== Usage and Adoption ==
- 1.95+ billion queries per month processed as of 2024.
- The infrastructure supports real-time analytics, AI agents, DAO coordination, and token data tooling.

The Graph is widely adopted in the web3 ecosystem and is recognized as a core layer in the decentralized data stack.

== Industry Recognition ==
The Graph has received widespread recognition in the industry:

- Described by Bloomberg as “the Google of blockchains.”
- Ranked among the top crypto projects by Fortune.
- Highlighted by Bitcoinist as one of the top AI crypto projects.

== Quotes ==
“The integration between Autonomys Network and The Graph provides a critical piece of infrastructure for deploying AI super dApps and on-chain AI agents at scale.”

— Crypto Reporter

“GRT support for Solana is a major move that will boost not just the SOL ecosystem, but border blockchain space.”

— Crypto.news on Chainlink CCIP integration
