= Decentralized autonomous organization =

Type of organization run via blockchain

A decentralized autonomous organization (DAO) is a software system for organization of other computer programs handled through a decentralized ledger technology like a blockchain. These systems are used most commonly to handle voting and finances, among other processes. The precise legal status of this type of organization system is unclear.

DAOs are closely associated with cryptocurrency and Web3. The name and concept originated with the 2016 launch of The DAO, a system built to manage an Ethereum-based venture capital fund amassing 3.6 million in ether cryptocurrency.

The governance of DAOs is subject to controversy. As these often allocate and distribute tokens that grant voting rights, their accumulation may lead to concentration of power. In fact, the first DAO, was hacked and drained of approximately US$50 million just weeks after its launch..

== Background ==
Although the term may be traced back to the 1990s, it was not until 2013 that it became more widely adopted. Although some argue that Bitcoin was the first DAO, the term is often understood today as software & smart contracts on top of an existing blockchain network.

Decentralized autonomous organization systems are typified by the use of decentralized technologies, such as blockchain technology, to provide a secure digital ledger to track digital interactions across the internet, hardened against forgery by trusted timestamping and dissemination of a distributed database. This approach eliminates the need to involve a mutually acceptable trusted third party in any decentralized digital interaction or cryptocurrency transaction. The costs of a blockchain-enabled transaction and of the associated data reporting may be substantially offset by the elimination of both the trusted third party and of the need for repetitive recording of contract exchanges in different records. For example, the blockchain data could, in principle and if regulatory structures permit it, replace public documents such as deeds and titles. In theory, a blockchain approach allows multiple cloud computing users to enter a loosely coupled peer-to-peer smart contract collaboration.

Vitalik Buterin proposed that after a DAO is launched, it might be organized to run without human managerial interactivity, provided the smart contracts are supported by a Turing-complete platform. Ethereum, built on a blockchain and launched in 2015, has been described as meeting that Turing threshold, thus enabling such DAOs. Decentralized autonomous organizations can facilitate open platforms through which individuals control their identities and their personal data.

== Governance ==
DAO governance is coordinated using tokens or NFTs that grant voting powers. Governance is conducted through a series of proposals that voting addresses vote on through the blockchain, and the possession of more governance tokens often translates to greater voting power. Inactive holders of governance tokens can be a major obstacle for DAO governance, which has led to implementations allowing voting power to be delegated to other parties.

== Issues ==
=== Social ===
Tokens that grant voting powers are often not used to vote. Inactive or non-voting addresses in DAOs often disrupt the organization's possible functionality.

Another risk is the concentration of power in the case that individual addresses accumulate large amounts of tokens that grant voting power. Concentration of these tokens may defeat ambitions to distribute governance power. In a study of a selected number of decentralized finance DAOs, the distribution of tokens was shown to be highly concentrated among a small number of addresses in the sample.

=== Legal status, liability, and regulation ===
The precise legal status of this type of business organization is generally unclear, and may vary by jurisdiction. On 1 July 2021, Wyoming became the first US state to recognize DAOs as a legal entity. American CryptoFed DAO became the first business entity so recognized. Some previous approaches to blockchain based companies have been regarded by the U.S. Securities and Exchange Commission as illegal offers of unregistered securities. Although often of uncertain legal standing, a DAO may functionally be a corporation without legal status as a corporation: a general partnership. Known participants, or those at the interface between a DAO and regulated financial systems, may be targets of regulatory enforcement or civil actions if they are out of compliance with the law.

=== Security ===
A DAO's code is difficult to alter once the system is up and running, including bug fixes that would be otherwise trivial in centralized code. Corrections to a DAO require writing new code and agreement to migrate all the funds. Although the code is visible to all, it is hard to repair, thus leaving known security holes open to exploitation unless a moratorium is called to enable bug fixing.

In 2016, a specific DAO, "The DAO", set a record for the largest crowdfunding campaign to date. Researchers pointed out multiple problems with The DAO's code. The DAO's operational procedure allowed investors to withdraw at will any money that had not yet been committed to a project; the funds could thus deplete quickly. Although safeguards aimed to prevent gaming shareholders' votes to win investments, there were a "number of security vulnerabilities". These enabled an attempted large withdrawal of funds from The DAO to be initiated in mid-June 2016. On 20 July 2016, the Ethereum blockchain was hard-forked to bail out the original contract. weeks later. The hack was reversed in the following weeks, and the money restored, via a hard fork of the Ethereum blockchain.

DAOs can be subject to coups or hostile takeovers that upend its voting structures especially if the voting power is based upon the number of tokens one owns. An example of this occurred in 2022, when one individual collected enough tokens to give themselves voting control over Build Finance DAO, which they then used to drain the DAO of all its cryptocurrency.

== List of notable DAOs ==
| Name | Token | Use cases | Network | Launch | Status |
|---|---|---|---|---|---|
| AssangeDAO | JUSTICE | Purchased Clock, an NFT artwork by Pak, to fund legal defense of WikiLeaks' founder Julian Assange | Ethereum | February 2022 | Operational |
| ConstitutionDAO | PEOPLE | Purchasing an original copy of the Constitution of the United States | Ethereum | November 2021 | Defunct |
| Internet Computer | ICP | Decentralized Governance, Protocol Upgrades, Community control of software | Internet Computer | May 2021 | Operational |
| FreeRossDAO | FREE | Clemency for Ross Ulbricht, criminal justice reform advocacy organization | Ethereum | December 2021 | Defunct by May 2023 |
| MakerDAO | MKR | Dai (cryptocurrency) stablecoin maintainer and regulator, lender | Ethereum | December 2017 | Operational |
| MoonDAO | MOONEY | Purchasing two seats on a Blue Origin flight to space and funding research to accelerate lunar settlement. | Ethereum | December 2021 | Operational |
| PleasrDAO | PEEPS | A group of art collectors who own the sole copy of the Wu Tang Clan album Once Upon a Time in Shaolin | Ethereum | April 2021 | Operational |
| The DAO | DAO | Venture capital | Ethereum | April 2016 | Defunct late 2016 due to hack |
| Uniswap | UNI | Decentralized exchange (DEX), Automated Market Making (AMM) | Ethereum & Celo | November 2018 | Operational |
| HairDAO | HAIR | Organization behind Anagen, attempting to crowdsource online biohackers to solve hair loss. | | 2023 | Operational |

== See also ==
- Aave — lending and borrowing of cryptocurrencies without the involvement of intermediary financial institutions
- Cooperative
- Decentralized Finance
- Decentralized application
- Decentralized computing
- Distributed computing
- Incentive-centered design
- List of highest-funded crowdfunding projects
- Smart contract
- The Social Contract
