= Uniswap =

Decentralized cryptocurrency exchange

- Other names: UNI
- Original author: Hayden Adams
- Developer: Uniswap Labs
- Release: November 2018
- Stable release: v4 / January 31, 2025; 20 months ago
- Written in: Solidity
- Platform: Avalanche; Base; Ethereum; Polygon
- Type: Decentralized exchange
- License: GNU General Public License v3.0
- Website: uniswap.org
- Repository: github.com/Uniswap/v4-core

Uniswap is a decentralized cryptocurrency exchange protocol built on the Ethereum blockchain. It enables the automated trading of digital assets through smart contracts, eliminating the need for intermediaries or centralized order books. Uniswap facilitates cryptocurrency tokens swaps using liquidity pools contributed by users.

The protocol, which runs on open-source software, was launched in 2018. As of December 2024, Uniswap is estimated to be the largest decentralized exchange and the seventh-largest cryptocurrency exchange overall by daily trading volume.

== History ==
Uniswap was created on November 2, 2018 by Hayden Adams, a former mechanical engineer at Siemens. Adams is the founder and CEO of Uniswap Labs, the company responsible for the development of the Uniswap Protocol, a decentralized exchange (DEX) built on the Ethereum blockchain. Adams launched Uniswap in November 2018, after working as a mechanical engineer and being inspired by a blog post written by Vitalik Buterin, the co-founder of Ethereum. His goal was to create a decentralized platform for exchanging tokens without relying on centralized exchanges.

Uniswap operates using open-source software on blockchain networks, and allows users to exchange cryptocurrencies directly from their wallets. Governance of the protocol is managed by holders of its native governance token, UNI, which was introduced in 2020 and distributed retroactively to early users. While UNI is used to vote on protocol upgrades and changes, it is not required to use the platform. Uniswap introduced the Automated Market Maker (AMM) model, which allows users to trade cryptocurrencies directly from their wallets.

=== Uniswap Labs ===
Uniswap Labs is a software company founded in 2018 by Hayden Adams. The company's early investors included venture capital firms like Andreessen Horowitz, Paradigm Operations, Union Square Ventures LLC and ParaFi.

In 2022 Uniswap Labs had raised $165 million, after announcing in 2021 that it was looking to raise between $100 and $200 million and was working with Polychain.

Uniswap offers products such as a self-custodial mobile wallet, a trading API for professional users, and a web interface. These tools provide access to liquidity across multiple blockchains, including Ethereum, Polygon, and Optimism.

=== Uniswap Foundation ===
The Uniswap Foundation was founded in 2022 by Devin Walsh and Ken Ng, after 95% of Uniswap token holders voted in favor of the proposal. The Foundation facilitates community governance of the Uniswap DAO, development of the Uniswap Protocol, and communication among contributors. Uniswap Foundation's most recent funding proposal, Uniswap Unleashed, outlined a plan to make the Uniswap Protocol the world’s infrastructure for digital value transfer with significant support for Uniswap v4 and Unichain. It passed with overwhelming support.

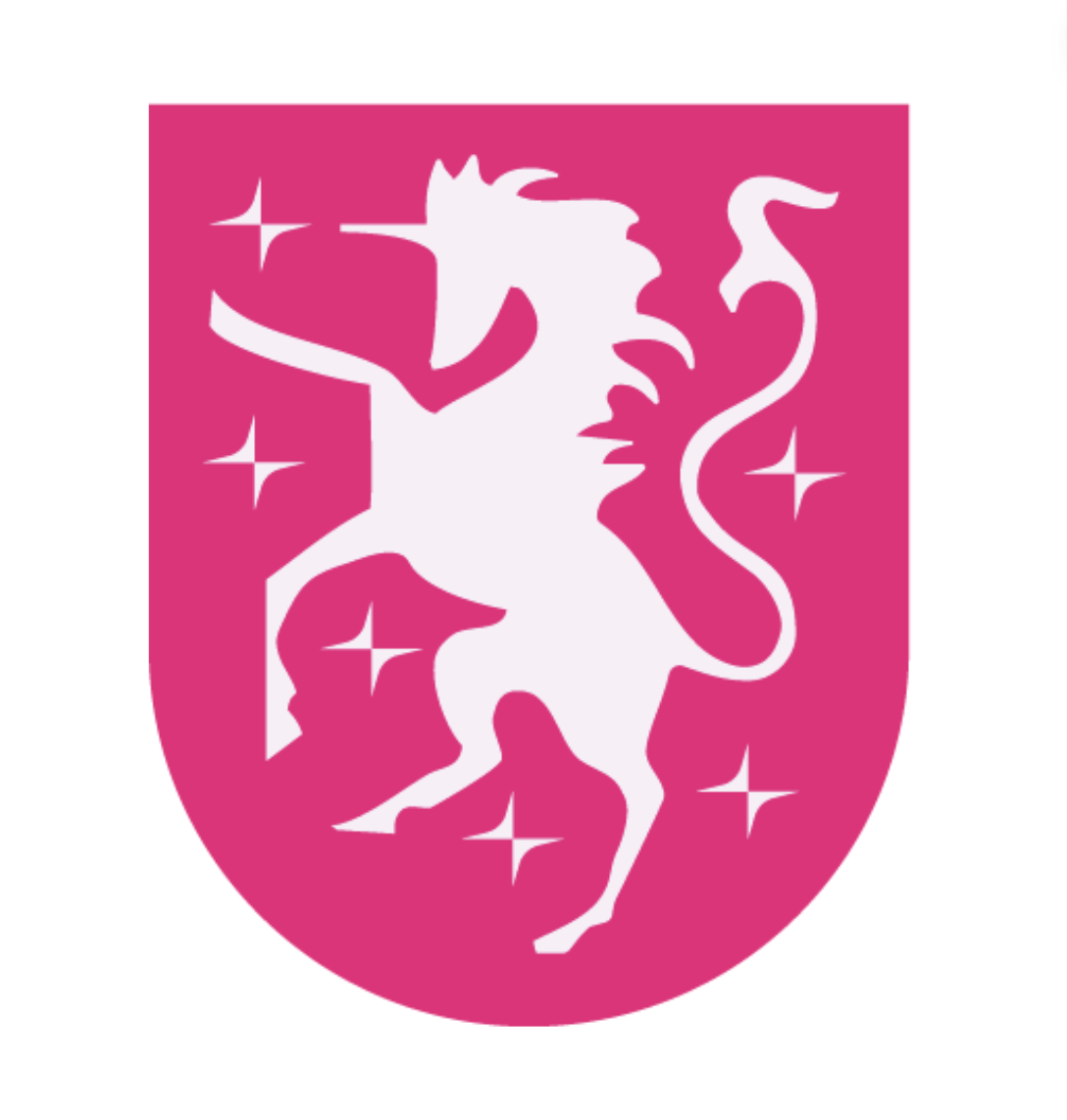
Uniswap Foundation logo

== Protocol ==
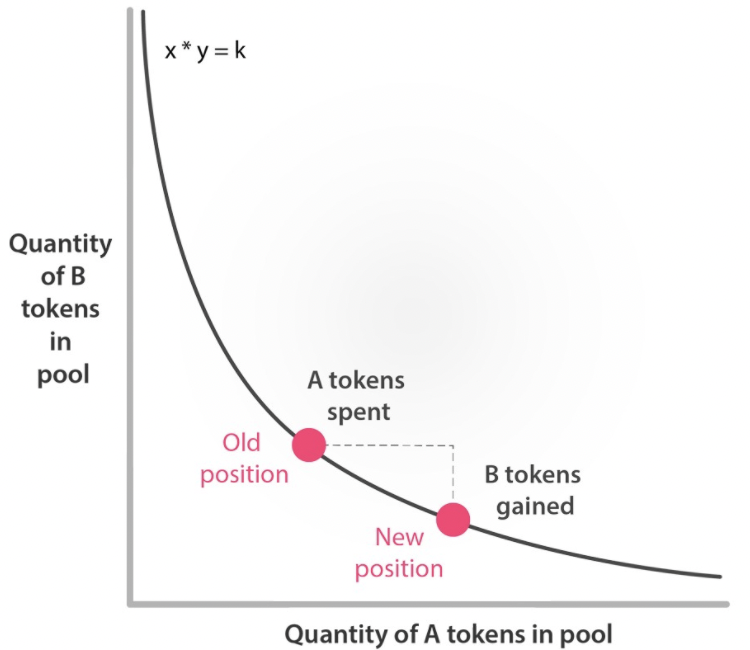
Constant product formula

Uniswap acts as an automated market maker and uses liquidity pools to fulfill orders, instead of relying on a traditional market maker, with an aim to create more efficient markets. Individuals and bots—termed "liquidity providers"—provide liquidity to the exchange by adding a pair of tokens to a smart contract which can be bought and sold by other users according to the constant-product rule $\phi(x, y) = xy$. In return, liquidity providers are given a percentage of the trading fees earned for that trading pair. For each trade, a certain amount of tokens is removed from the pool for an amount of the other token, thereby changing the price. No fees are required to list tokens.

Version 3, released on 5 May 2021, added concentrated liquidity, which lets liquidity providers supply capital within a chosen price range instead of across all prices. Version 4, released on 31 January 2025, introduced "hooks", contracts that customise how individual pools behave, and consolidated liquidity into a single smart contract.

In December 2025, Uniswap governance approved the “UNIfication” proposal, enabling protocol fees (the “fee switch”) and introducing a deflationary mechanism tied to protocol revenue. Under the rollout described by Uniswap, Uniswap v2 pools would shift from a 0.30% liquidity-provider fee to 0.25% for liquidity providers plus a 0.05% protocol fee, while selected Uniswap v3 pools would route a portion of LP fees to the protocol depending on the pool’s fee tier; the proposal also included a one-time burn of 100 million UNI from the treasury after a timelock period and an ongoing burn mechanism funded by protocol fees (including sequencer revenue from Unichain after costs and allocations).

== UNI token ==
UNI is the governance token of the Uniswap protocol, enabling holders to participate in the platform's decentralized governance.

The token allows holders to propose and vote on protocol upgrades, changes to fee structures, and other governance-related matters. UNI operates on the Ethereum blockchain following the ERC-20 standard, ensuring compatibility with a wide range of decentralized applications. Its total supply is capped, with a scheduled release over several years to support ongoing development and ecosystem growth.

== See also ==
- PancakeSwap
- List of bitcoin companies
