= Ember Sword =

Cancelled MMORPG

- Developer: Bright Star Studios
- Director: Maxim Zimnukhov
- Producers: Sage Durain; Joris Huijbregts; Victor Rubinstein; Samuel Horton
- Designer: Maciej Ostrowski
- Writer: Samuel Horton
- Composer: Jannick Damkvist
- Engine: Project SERIUS
- Platforms: macOS; Windows
- Release: December 2, 2024 (Early access)
- Genres: MMORPG, Sandbox
- Mode: Multiplayer

Ember Sword was a planned massively multiplayer online role-playing sandbox blockchain game developed by Bright Star Studios for macOS and Windows. Presented from a three-dimensional isometric perspective, Ember Sword had players battle against each other or non-player characters, enhancing their character's abilities by equipping different weapons and armor. Players were able to trade with each other for resources or loot them from slain foes. The game integrated the Ethereum blockchain, which allowed for players to use non-fungible tokens to acquire items.

The game entered early access on December 2, 2024, with browser accessibility. Its servers were shut down on May 21, 2025.

== Gameplay ==
Players could control a character avatar from a 3D isometric perspective. Characters were factionless; with combat with hostile non-player characters (NPCs) called "mobs" or other players in designated player versus player arena spaces. Abilities were tied directly to the types of weapons that were equipped, with better weapons and armor provided as a reward for defeating enemies. The game intended to offer non-combat activities, such as farming crops.

Rare cosmetic items and land were to be stored via blockchain. Ember Sword would follow a play-to-earn business model; currency earned by slaying mobs, selling items and trading with players would be exchanged for tokens that convert to Ethereum cryptocurrency. Players were able to acquire land, intended to eventually be available for real estate development.

== Development ==
Production of Ember Sword began in 2018, under the Danish developer So Couch Studios, led by chief executive officer Mark Laursen. It was announced in October of that year. Initially developed on the Unity game engine, Ember Sword was intended designed for Windows and Android operating systems. The Ethereum blockchain was intended to be integrated into the game, which will allow for players to acquire tokenized cosmetics through gameplay, tradable for the in-game currency called "PIXEL". In April 2020, the venture capitalist firm Galaxy Interactive announced a $700,000 pre-seed investment alongside Play Ventures in the game's developer, renamed Bright Star Studios. An initial virtual sale of in-game land was held in May 2021; the four thousand available plots sold out within six hours.

In July 2021, Bright Star held a subsequent virtual land sale, resulting in over $203 million being pledged from approximately 35,000 applications for plots. Shortly after the conclusion of the initial land sale, a $2 million investment deal from the previous May was announced.

Ember Sword initially was to rely upon Polygon (MATIC) as the platform for handling Ethereum, but with the establishment of Immutable Pty Ltd's Immutable X platform, Bright Star announced in March 2022 that it would migrate to the newer platform, alongside a $100 million partnership with GameStop. Bright Star decided in 2021 to abandon Unity as the game engine and develop a proprietary engine that would favor browser accessibility and streaming media. Bright Star initially contracted with a third-party engine developer, but decided to develop a proprietary engine in-house. Five game engines were attempted before Bright Star created the final iteration called Project SERIUS. The game's token, rebranded as "$Ember", was launched on June 13, 2024. In August 2024, the game was announced to be migrating layer 2 protocols, from Immutable X to Mantle.

== Early access release and cancellation ==
In April 2022, virtual land owners and VIP badge holders were given access to a pre-alpha technical test of the game. A year later, an alpha test was held, focused on a new area and demonstrating rudimentary core mechanics. A subsequent vertical slice alpha demo was released in October 23, allowing players to participate in raids. The game's closed beta, dubbed the "Prologue", began on July 12, 2024. The game began early access testing on December 2, 2024. In a December 18 review for MMORPG.com, Steven Wilber negatively compared the early access version to previous beta and preview versions, saying "even at this early stage, it was clear that Ember Sword still has a long way to go in nearly every facet of its gameplay."

On May 21, 2025, Bright Star Studios announced that despite having raised over around $11 million from land sales and $8 million in funding rounds, development and server support for Ember Sword would end due to insufficient funding.
