= Build Finance DAO =

The Build Finance DAO was a decentralized autonomous organization (DAO), a venture based on blockchain technology. It was the subject of a 2022 hostile takeover by a member who amassed enough votes to pass a motion that allowed them to liquidate the DAO's cryptocurrency holdings and flood the market with new tokens.

== History ==
Build Finance DAO was formed around September 2020. It was described as a "decentralized venture builder", designed around its BUILD token, that would fund new ventures. The ventures funded by the DAO would adopt the BUILD token, helping popularize it. As a DAO with token-based membership its decisions would be based on voting power.

== Takeover ==
In February 2022 a user amassed enough tokens to take over control of the DAO. The user then made a governance proposal which would allow it to issue new tokens, which initially failed but succeeded on the second attempt.

The success of the proposal left the other members of the Build Finance DAO without any control of the governance of the DAO. The user then took a number of steps to liquidate the DAO's holdings and issued over 1 billion new BUILD tokens. Their activities generated a gain of about 160 ETH, or about US$470,000, which were laundered through coin tumblers preventing identification of the user.

== Aftermath ==
Attempts to convince the user to return the funds were unsuccessful.

The Build Finance hostile takeover has been described as a rare example of a "rug pull" which was not initiated by insiders, and an illustration of the risks of majority-based voting on decentralized finance projects, and of the need to anticipate risks and attack vectors in designing DAOs. One author suggested it highlights a need for quorum requirements.
