= Sergey Nazarov (businessman) =

American entrepreneur

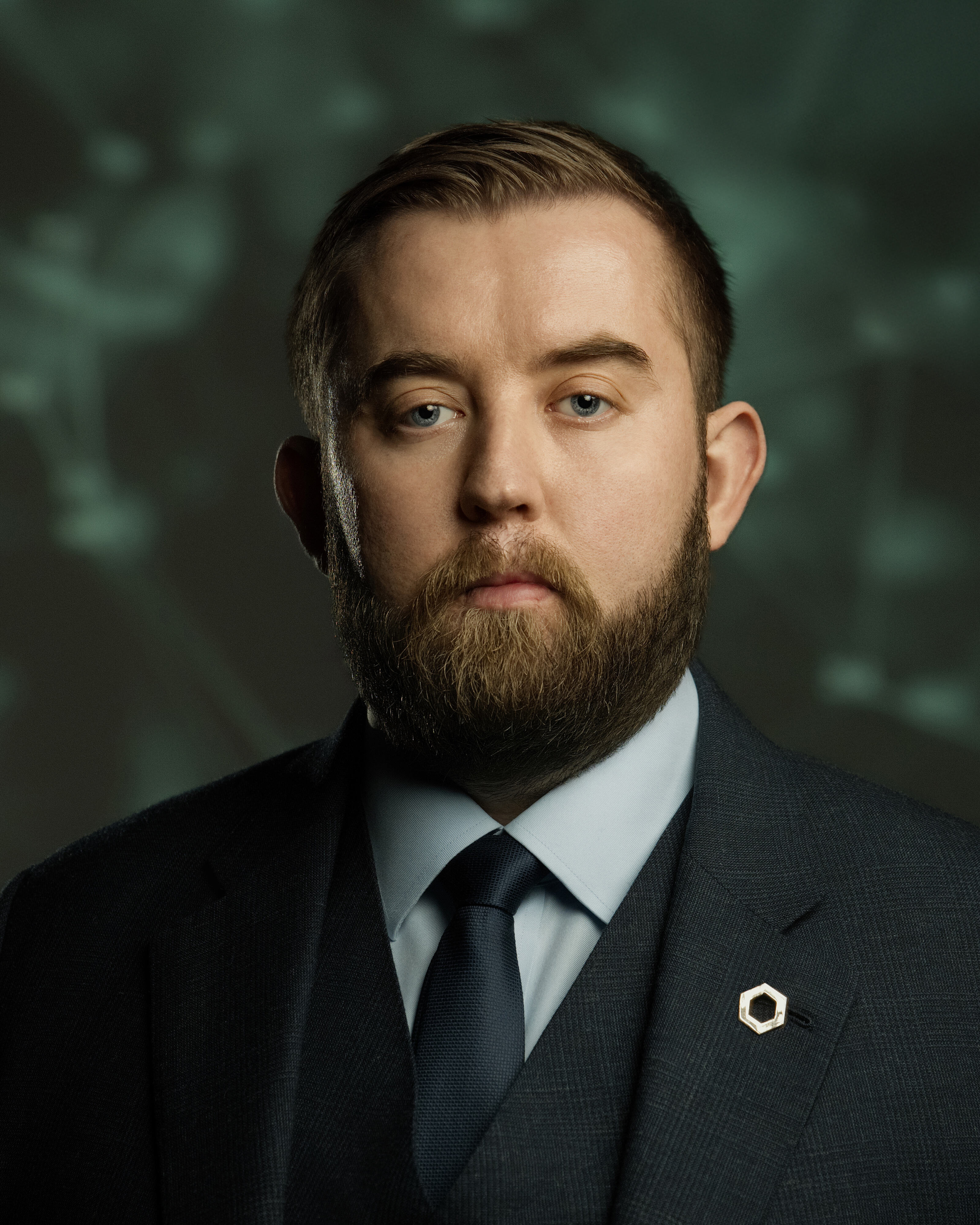
- Sergey Nazarov
- Born: 1989 (age 36–37); Soviet Union
- Education: New York University
- Occupations: Entrepreneur; technologist
- Known for: Co-founder of Chainlink

Sergey Nazarov (born 1989) is an American entrepreneur and technologist who co-founded the decentralized blockchain oracle network Chainlink.

== Early life and education ==
Nazarov was born in 1989. His parents were engineers. In the early 1990s, they emigrated from the Soviet Union to the United States. In 2007, he graduated from New York University with a bachelor’s degree in philosophy and management. Following his graduation, Nazarov was a teaching assistant at the New York University's Stern School of Business.

== Career ==
In 2009, Nazarov co-founded the peer-to-peer marketplace ExistLocal and worked at the venture capital firm FirstMark Capital. In 2011, he established QED Capital, an early-stage venture fund. Through QED, he launched the decentralized email service CryptaMail and the Secure Asset Exchange in 2014.

In September 2014, Nazarov co-founded SmartContract.com with Steve Ellis. The company worked with Cornell Tech professor Ari Juels to develop a decentralized oracle network. This work led to the launch of Chainlink in June 2017, accompanied by a white paper co-authored by Nazarov, Ellis, and Juels. Nazarov was also part of a team that worked with SWIFT on a pilot project for automated bond payments using a smart contract. As CEO of Chainlink Labs, Nazarov oversaw the project's growth and developed features including Proof-of-Reserve and the Cross-Chain Interoperability Protocol (CCIP).

In March 2025, Nazarov was invited to the Crypto Summit, held in the White House, in Washington, D.C. In July 2025, Nazarov was present at the White House during the signing ceremony for the GENIUS Act.

In February 2026, Nazarov was selected to serve on the Innovation Advisory Committee of the Commodity Futures Trading Commission (CFTC).

== Selected publications ==
- Ellis, Steve; Juels, Ari; Nazarov, Sergey (September 4, 2017). "ChainLink: A Decentralized Oracle Network" (PDF). Chainlink.
- Juels, Ari; Breidenbach, Lorenz (November 20, 2019). "Mixicles: Simple Private Decentralized Finance". Chainlink.
- "Bridging the Governance Gap: Interoperability for blockchain and legacy systems". World Economic Forum. December 2020.
- Breidenbach, Lorenz; Cachin, Christian; Chan, Benedikt; Coventry, Alex; Ellis, Steve; Juels, Ari; Koushanfar, Farinaz; Miller, Andrew; Magauran, Brendan; Moroz, Daniel; Nazarov, Sergey; Topliceanu, Alexandru; Zhang, Fan (April 15, 2021). "Chainlink 2.0: Next Steps in the Evolution of Decentralized Oracle Networks" (PDF). Chainlink Labs.
- "Connecting Blockchains: Overcoming Fragmentation in Tokenised Assets". Swift. August 31, 2023.
