= Slippage (finance) =

Difference between estimated transaction costs and the amount actually paid

In finance and the stock market, slippage is the difference between the execution price expected by the trader (usually the one indicated by the trading software) and the one at which the transaction actually happens. Market impact, liquidity, and frictional costs may contribute to slippage.

Algorithmic trading is often used to reduce slippage, and algorithms can be backtested on past data to see the effects of slippage, but it is impossible to eliminate.

== Measurement ==
=== Using initial mid price ===
Nassim Nicholas Taleb (1997) defines slippage as the difference between the average execution price and the initial midpoint of the bid and the offer for a given quantity to be executed.

=== Using initial execution price ===
Knight and Satchell mention a flow trader needs to consider the effect of executing a large order on the market and to adjust the bid-ask spread accordingly. They calculate the liquidity cost as the difference between the execution price and the initial execution price.

== Example ==
In a low-liquidity situation (like less-popular and thinly traded cryptocurrencies), slippage can become extremely large, as arbitrage trades will be executed by market participants to fill the order at very high price. In a well-known example, a trader used 50 million dollars to buy effectively $36,000 worth of Aave coin.

== Reverse slippage ==
Reverse slippage, as described by Taleb, occurs when the purchase of a large position is done at increasing prices, so that the mark to market value of the position increases. The danger occurs when the trader attempts to exit their position. If the trader manages to create a squeeze large enough then this phenomenon can be profitable. This can also be considered a type of market making.

== See also ==
- Implementation shortfall
- Time-weighted average price

== Sources ==
- Trading For A Living: Chapter 1 - Introduction To Trading. Ampersand. 2025.
- Gill, Prabhjote (March 12, 2026). "A $50 million crypto trade on Aave went horribly wrong: Bots scalp profit while retail debates what really happened". MSN. Stocktwits.
