= Stepico Games =

Video game development company

Stepico
- Type: Private
- Industry: Video games
- Founded: 2014
- Founder: Nikola Pisetskyi
- Headquarters: Lviv, Ukraine
- Area served: Worldwide
- Number of employees: 200+
- Subsidiaries: Inkration
- Website: stepico.com

Stepico (also known as Stepico Games) is a European video game development company headquartered in Lviv, Ukraine. It is focused on development, art production, and live operations services for projects on mobile, PC, and console platforms.

== History ==
Stepico was founded in 2014 in Lviv, Ukraine. It initially operated as a game development outsourcing company. Since 2020, Stepico Games has developed Web3 titles including Guild of Guardians in collaboration with Immutable and Loaded Lions: Mane City with Crypto.com.

By 2021, the company had gained visibility through initiatives such as the Stepico Unity Jam, an all-Ukrainian online hackathon. In June 2021, Stepico became a member of the Lviv IT Cluster.

In 2022, Stepico acquired Inkration, a game art production studio, which specialized in art, game design, animation, and 3D production. Following the acquisition, the combined team exceeded 200 employees.

After the beginning of the full-scale Russian invasion of Ukraine, Stepico continued its operations and retained the majority of its employees while shifting to remote work. The company maintained ongoing projects, including Guild of Guardians, Nile Valley, and Fishing Rival. Stepico donated over US$20,000 to the Armed Forces of Ukraine, supported volunteers with vehicles and humanitarian aid, and provided assistance to employees involved in defense efforts.

In May 2023, Stepico announced the start of development of Discovery, a science fiction shooter created with Unreal Engine.

In 2025, Stepico opened a representative office in Australia and joined IGEA, the main industry association for video game and entertainment companies in Australia and New Zealand, which provides advocacy, research, education, and promotes the industry locally and internationally.

In February 2025, the company signed a memorandum of cooperation with the Academy for Heroes NGO to support Ukrainian veterans in transitioning to technology and game development careers. It also supports NGO Kids of Ukraine aimed at supporting children affected by the war. In 2022, the company helped organize an NFT art project: displaced teenagers participating in psychological recovery camps created drawings which Stepico's artists digitized and sold as NFTs, with proceeds directed to fund the camps.

== Activities ==
Stepico is a full-cycle game development company, services include concept and pre-production, through programming, art and animation, quality assurance, publishing, and post-release support (LiveOps). Stepico has collaborated with major global publishers, licensors, and IP holders, including NBC Universal, DreamWorks, Disney, Marvel, Rovio, Gameloft, Playrix, Epic Games and others. The studio uses industry-standard engines such as Unity and Unreal.

== Operations ==
Stepico is headquartered in Lviv, Ukraine, with additional offices in New York, United States, and Limassol, Cyprus. The company employs more than 200 people across its development, art, and management departments.

== Games ==
Year	Title	Platform(s)	Publisher
2024	Fishing Rival	Mobile (iOS, Android)	8k Games
2024	Snow Island	PC (Steam)	Outside the Zoo
2023	Discovery	PC, VR (Meta Quest)	8k Games
2023	Loaded Lions: Mane City	Web, Mobile (Android)	Crypto.com
2022	MetaPopit	PC (Windows)	
2021	Guild of Guardians	iOS, Android	Immutable / Stepico
2021	Nile Valley	iOS, Android	8k Games
2020	Alien 911	PC (Steam)	Kicksome Entertainment
2019	Century Siege	iOS, Android	Goober Games
2019	Hero Ring	Mobile (iOS, Android)	Stepico
2017	MMA Manager	iOS, Android	Prey Studios
2017	BigFoot	PC (Steam)	CyberLight Game Studio
