= Markus Jakobsson =

American computer security researcher, entrepreneur and writer

- Education: University of California, San Diego
- Occupations: Computer Security Researcher, Entrepreneur, Writer
- Scientific career
- Thesis: Privacy vs. authenticity (1997)
- Doctoral advisor: Russell Impagliazzo
- Website: www.markus-jakobsson.com

Markus Jakobsson is a computer security researcher, entrepreneur and writer, whose work is focused on the issue of digital security.

== Career ==
Markus Jakobsson is currently chief scientist at Artema Labs, a company with the mission of disrupting and improving the crypto and NFT markets. Prior to his current role, he has been chief scientist at ByteDance; chief of security and data analytics at Amber Solutions, and chief scientist at Agari.

Prior to that, he was a senior director at Qualcomm as a result of Qualcomm acquiring FatSkunk in 2014; Jakobsson founded FatSkunk in 2009, and served as its CTO until the acquisition. Prior to his position at Qualcomm, Jakobsson has served as principal scientist of Consumer Security at PayPal, held positions as the principal scientist for Palo Alto Research Center and RSA Security, and served as vice president of the International Financial Cryptography Association. Prior to these positions, he was a member of the technical staff at Bell Labs, and held a position at Xerox PARC. In addition, Jakobsson serves as an expert witness and is a member of the software and networking litigation group Harbor Labs.

He has a background in higher education, having served as an associate professor at Indiana University where he was also a cybersecurity researcher and co-director of the Center for Applied Cybersecurity Research. He has also served as an adjunct associate professor at New York University.

== Companies founded and advisory positions ==
In, 2021, Jakobsson co-founded Artema Labs. In 2004, Jakobsson was one of the founders of the digital security company RavenWhite. The Silicon Valley company offers device identification technologies and other authentication solutions for businesses that pair customer identity with digital privacy. In 2006, he launched securitycartoon.com with Dr. Sukamol Srikwan. A website using comics to teach security awareness and understanding among the average internet user, it became the basis for the company Extricatus, which developed Fastwords, an online password creation system where users create secure passwords made of a string of everyday words in order to make them easy to remember. In 2009, Jakobsson co-founded Fatskunk, a company that targets malware that attacks wireless devices such as tablets and smartphones. He founded ZapFraud Inc in 2013. ZapFraud is an IP holding company with a portfolio related to targeted email attacks, including phishing and business email compromise. Markus has served on the advisory boards for Metaforic, a VC-backed company that markets software that other developers can incorporate into their own for greater security, and Lifelock, an identity protection company. In addition, he is a visiting research fellow of the Anti-Phishing Working Group (APWG), an organization focused on reducing cybercrime.

== Education ==
Jakobsson holds a PhD in computer science from the University of California at San Diego, as well as master's degrees from both the University of California at San Diego and Lund University in Sweden.

== Academic research ==
Jakobsson's early research publications were focused on cryptography. Later research emphasis was aimed at understanding and preventing fraud. With Filippo Menczer and two students, he also conducted live experiments on Internet users in order to determine the ways users were likely to fall victim to various forms on online fraud. His later research was focused toward mobile security and the detection of malware on mobile platforms.

In a 1999 paper he, together with Ari Juels, coined the term "proof of work", a central concept in cryptocurrencies such as Bitcoin.

== Personal life ==
He is the brother of Hampus Jakobsson, an investor and tech entrepreneur, and Andreas Jakobsson, a professor of mathematical statistics at Lund University.

== Bibliography ==
Jakobsson is the author or editor of a series of books and studies dealing with the world of internet security and its practical applications for businesses and individual users.

- Phishing and Countermeasures: Understanding the Increasing Problem of Electronic Identity Theft, Markus Jakobsson, Steven Myers - Editors, Wiley-Interscience, 2006
- Crimeware: Understanding New Attacks and Defenses, Markus Jakobsson, Zulfikar Ramzan - Authors, Addison-Wesley Professional, 2008
- Towards Trustworthy Elections: New Directions in Electronic Voting (Lecture Notes in Computer Science / Security and Cryptology), David Chaum, Markus Jakobsson, Ronald L. Rivest, Peter Y. A. Ryan, Josh Benaloh, Miroslaw Kutylowski, Editors, Springer, 2010
- The Death of the Internet, Markus Jakobsson - Editor, Wiley-IEEE Computer Society Pr, 2012
- Mobile Authentication: Problems and Solutions (SpringerBriefs in Computer Science), Markus Jakobsson, Author, Springer, 2012
