= Incentive-centered design =

Systems-design paradigm

Incentive-centered design (ICD) is the science of designing a system or institution according to the alignment of individual and user incentives with the goals of the system. Using incentive-centered design, system designers can observe systematic and predictable tendencies in users in response to motivators to provide or manage incentives to induce a greater amount and more valuable participation. ICD is often considered when designing a system to induce desirable behaviors from users, such as participation and cooperation. It draws from principles in various areas such as Economics, Psychology, Sociology, Design, and Engineering. ICD has been gaining attention in research communities due to the role it can play in helping systems benefit their users and ultimately achieve better results. This is also relevant to the incentive-based frameworks inside Human-Computer Interaction.

== History ==
In 1996, the Nobel Prize in Economics was awarded to William Vickrey and James Mirrlees for their work in "The economic theory of incentives under asymmetric information", which was a core issue addressed by the theory of mechanism design. The theory of mechanism design was an antecedent to incentive-centered design, and on October 15, 2007, Roger Myerson, Leonid Hurwicz and Eric Maskin received the Nobel Prize in Economics from the Royal Swedish Academy of Sciences for their contributions to that theory. Leonid Hurwicz was the founder of the theory of mechanism design, which is a branch in economics that deals with game theory. In mechanism design, designers try to satisfy design goals in specific sets of games by setting outcome functions and message space of the game. The idea of designing "mechanisms", or sets of institutional participation rules, in order to achieve the designer's goals for a system, is a core concept for ICD.

In 2001, the STIET program (Socio-Technical Infrastructure for Electronic Transactions) received a grant to fund for doctoral fellowships and a multidisciplinary program for the University of Michigan. The program aimed to train, research, and outreach to modern information systems through an incentive-centered design approach. The participants in the program composed of doctoral students and also faculty members of the universities. In 2004, Paul Resnick, one of the four faculty members in the STIET research group of Michigan coined the phrase "Incentive-centered Design" to describe the type of work they did. In 2007, Wayne State University joined the University of Michigan to focus the program on Incentive-centered Design, and the STIET program received a five-year renewal grant that allowed for research in incentive-centered design.

From 2010 to 2015, approximately fifty British academics engaged in the ORCHID project, with one of their chief aims being to elaborate the principles of ICD (referred to as "incentive engineering").

== Interdisciplinary concepts ==
Interdisciplinary concepts
Disciplines
- Information security User-generated content Reputation systems Social computing Recommender systems Online auction

Incentive-centered design branches from various areas and can be applied to a multitude of systems and concepts. It is closely related to user-centered design in that it takes user's wants, needs, and limitations during the design process for a product. Additionally, ICD is connected to human–computer interaction since it involves the conjunction of humans and machines and how the two can mend together well. In particular, ICD blends together the goals of the user and the goals of the system so that the user can have a pleasant and valuable experience while using the system, and the system can give the user what they need and ultimately become more aware and responsive to varying needs. ICD also borrows from the Theory of Incentives. Conflicting objectives and decentralized information are two of the main components of the Theory of Incentives. ICD works to understand the objectives of the user and the system and combine and process information so that both parties obtain optimal results.

=== Information security ===
Information security is the concept of protecting information and information systems from unauthorized access and use. Incentive-centered design can assist in bringing into consideration the errors that humans can make when using a system. These errors could potentially lead to weaknesses in the system that can be taken advantage of by attackers. With ICD, a system can guide a user into providing appropriate and adequate information to prevent system weaknesses. A simple example would be the generation of passwords. By providing users tips, motivation and feedback on the passwords that they choose, systems can ensure that user accounts have a significantly decreased chance of getting attacked.

=== User-generated content ===
User-generated content in simple terms, refers to media content that are created by users that are made publicly available on the internet. Incentives for users to contribute to user-generated content would be receiving recognition for their work, connecting with others, and self-expression. Examples would include users uploading their own videos on the YouTube platform, posting reviews on a website, etc. User-generated content has three requirements. One is the publication requirement, and the second is the creative effort requirement - users must add their own original creative effort and value into their work. The final requirement is that the creation is outside of professional routines and practices - most user-generated content is non-professional and have no relation with anything institutional or commercial.

=== Reputation systems ===
Everything has a reputation - goods, services, companies, service providers, etc., and by basing on the collection of opinions of other entities on those things, the reputation system uses an algorithm to generate reputation scores for those things. Reputation systems are similar to recommendation systems - purchasing decisions of goods and services are influenced by the reputation scores of those goods and services, and goods with high reputation scores will attract more buyers. Examples would include Amazon and eBay, where customers who purchase the item are able to rate and review the quality of the product. The cumulative ratings would be displayed for the product, indicating its quality and popularity. A relation to incentive-centered design would be that if sellers on eBay have a high reputation, then other users would be inclined to buy from them or if the item itself has high ratings, users will be more likely to go for that item.

=== Social computing ===
Social computing concerns the intertwining of computational systems and social behavior. Social computing entails a high level of community formation, user content creation, and collective action. Peer-to-peer networks, open source communities, and wikis are all examples of forms of social computing. In such areas, incentives are provided in the form of respect and recognition for users who provide high quality content and contributions. As a result of these contributions, the system overall becomes of higher quality.

=== Recommender systems ===
Recommender systems attempt to predict the 'rating' or 'preference' a user would have of a particular item based on either attributes of the item or attributes of the social network related to the user. These recommendation systems can be seen in places such as social networks suggesting new friends, shopping sites recommending related clothing, etc. The Netflix Recommender System is designed to incentivize participation from the user, aligning the systems interests with the users interests. The users want to find content they are interested in, and Netflix wants to be able to provide better recommendations to their users. The star system that Netflix provides allows for both parties to benefit.

=== Online auction design ===
An online auction is essentially an auction on the internet. Different formats range from descending auctions to sealed-bid auctions. A huge variety of goods and services can be sold in online auctions, and there are hundreds of different websites that are all for online auctions. A well-known example would be eBay, where users on the site can sell their own personal items for others to buy. In relation to incentive-centered design, sites such as eBay allow users to rate the product the purchased. Sellers and goods that have large numbers of high ratings will attract more buyers compared with unreliable sellers and poor quality goods for sale in the auction.

== Current research ==
Current research is being conducted by the University of Michigan and Wayne State University through their STIET program. The program has made significant contributions to the field of incentive-centered design, and a lot of the research involves game theory models, strategic interaction, and rational decision making.

For example, on July 10, 2008, Rahul Sami and Stanko Dimitrov researched bluffing in prediction markets (In the prediction market, participants bet on the outcome of the market). Another would be in July 2009, Michael Wellman and Patrick Jordan both designed the Ad Auction game, and they both developed the strategies and trading interfaces for the game as well. In 2010, Robert Reynolds and Leonard Kinniard-Heether worked on to train a neural network controller to play the video game Super Mario through the use of the Cultural Algorithm Toolkit system (CAT 3.0).

== Practical applications ==
This section is about the practical/current applications of incentive-centered design. It includes examples and applications of the technique in existing products/systems.

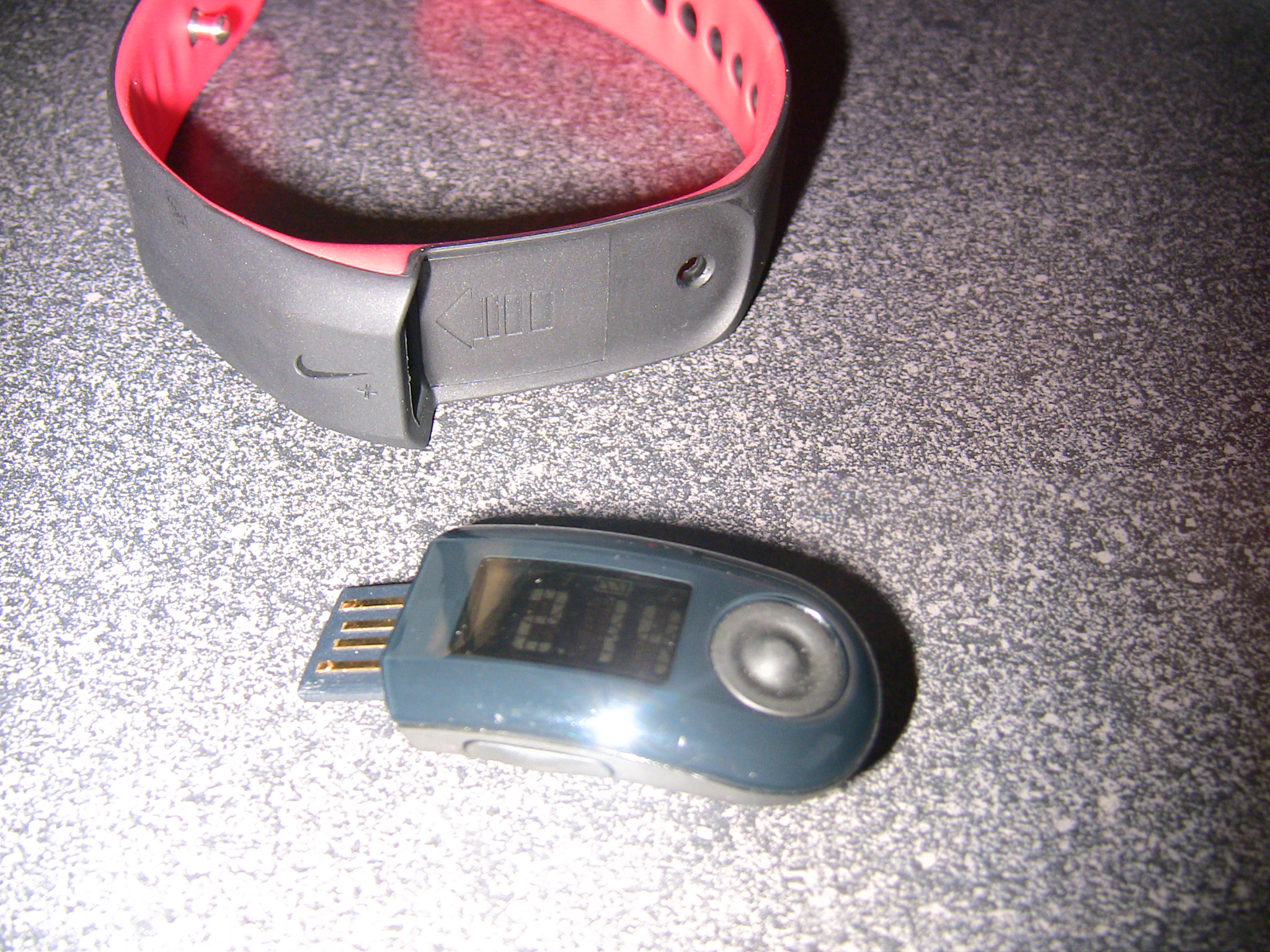
Nike+ iPod Product

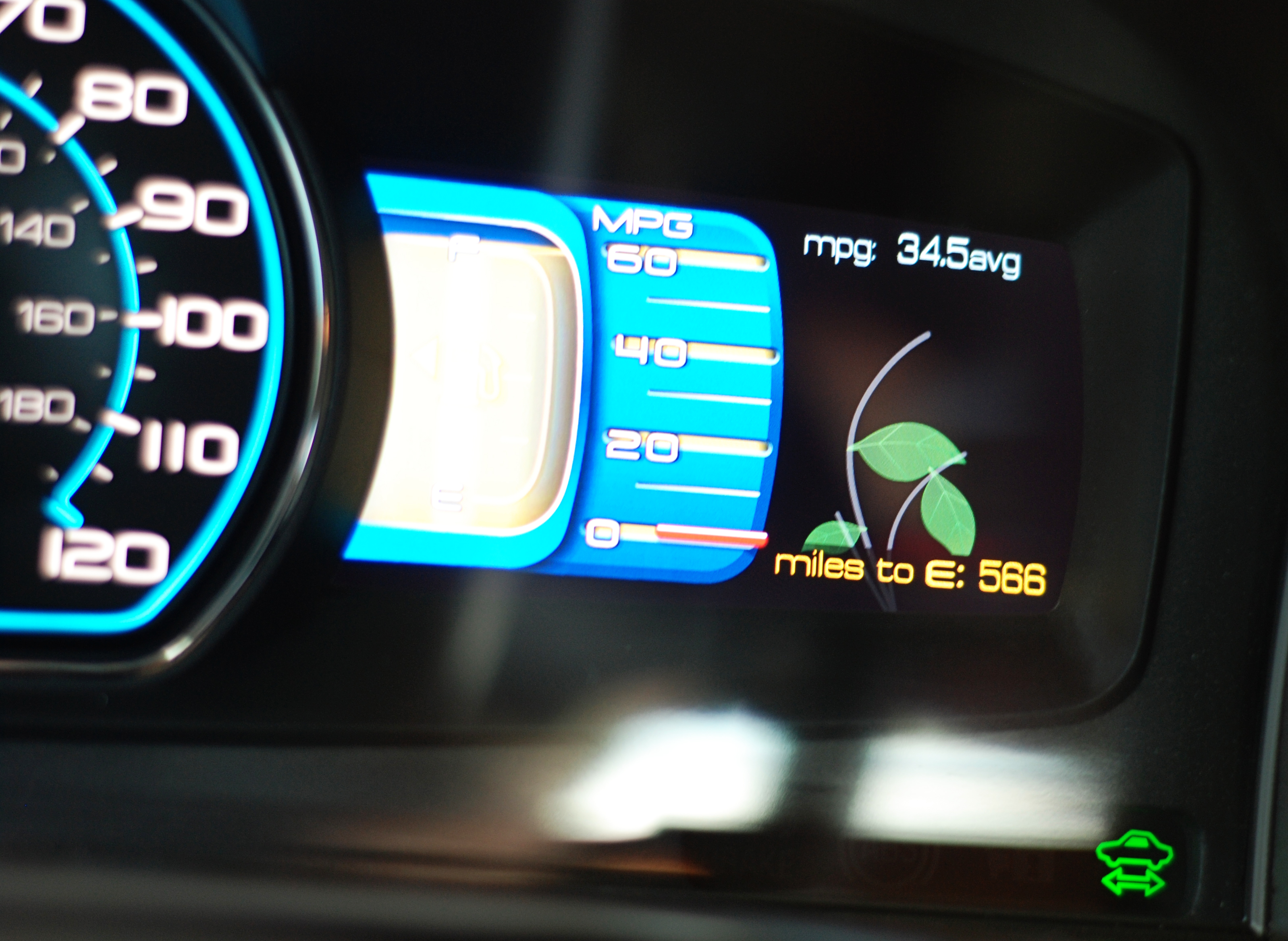
Ford Hybrid Car - Incentive via Growing Plant

=== Nike+iPod Sports Kit ===
This sports kit from Nike (Nike+iPod) comes with a receiver that attaches to your iPod or iPhone and a transmitter that is placed in the sole of the shoe. The kit is a running measurement kit – it measures the time of the user's workout, the distance run, the amount of calories burned, speed, etc. The example of user-incentive design in this system is that when users reach milestones in goal-oriented workouts or achieve personal records, there will be pre-recorded audio feedback from famous sports athletes acknowledging the achievement and also congratulating the user.

=== Ford Hybrid Car ===
In the 2010 Ford Fusion and Mercury Milan hybrid sedans, the instrumental panels are designed so that the screen shows the cloudy sky and the grass. When drivers are driving in a fuel-efficient manner, then the green leaves that appear on the panels will multiply accordingly. This goal-oriented display could motivate the driver to motor in a more fuel-efficient manner.

=== Class grading system at Indiana University ===
Inspired by games such as World of Warcraft, professors at Indiana University changed their course grading system so that it appears to be like a quest in a video game. Students will start off with 0 experience points, and class requirements such as homework, class attendance, exams, and projects are turned into "quests", "fighting monsters", "crafting", and "joining a guild". Lee Sheldon, a university course coordinator, found that student interest and performance increased after such change in the college coursework grading system.

=== Achievements ===
In Xbox 360 games, players can unlock Xbox achievements throughout the game. Each achievement is different and requires and challenges the user to complete a certain task. While the Xbox 360 was the first to use achievements, other platforms offer a comparable incentive system as well, including trophies on PlayStation 3 and achievements on Steam.

== See also ==
- Gamification
