= Immutable (company) =

Australian crypto gaming company

Immutable Pty Ltd.
- Formerly: Fuel Games
- Type: Private
- Industry: Crypto Assets; Video Gaming
- Founded: 2018; 8 years ago
- Founder: Robbie Ferguson, James Ferguson, Alex Connolly
- Headquarters: Sydney, Australia
- Products: Gods Unchained; Guild of Guardians
- Website: www.immutable.com

Immutable Pty Ltd (formerly Fuel Games) is an Australian video game company which develops blockchain games and non-fungible tokens (NFTs). The company was founded in 2018 and headquartered in Sydney, Australia.

== History ==
Robbie Ferguson, James Ferguson, and Alex Connolly founded Fuel Games in 2018.

The company's first blockchain-based game, Etherbots, was released in February 2018, allowing players to own and battle digital robots on the Ethereum blockchain.

In July 2018, Fuel Games launched the pre-sale of Gods Unchained, marketed as a blockchain-based e-sport. This followed a successful $2.4 million seed funding round led by Continue Capital and Nirvana Capital, with additional support from Sora Ventures and Coinbase.

In 2019, Fuel Games rebranded as Immutable and expanded its focus to include an NFT exchange platform. The company developed Immutable X, an Ethereum Layer-2 blockchain, in collaboration with StarkWare. Immutable X has been used to build NFT marketplaces for companies including TikTok, GameStop, Illuvium and Bright Star Studios, the developers of Ember Sword. It also supports the back-end operations of Disney and Marvel's crypto businesses. The company purports to offset carbon via carbon credit programs. In 2019, Immutable offered to cover the prize money that had been withheld by another gaming company from a professional gamer who had expressed support for Hong Kong protests against the government at the time.

In 2021, Immutable partnered with NRG Esports to create NFT collectibles for the "Guild of Guardians" mobile RPG, raising $3 million through the sale of founders' collectible NFTs. In February 2022, Immutable announced a $100 million fund in partnership with GameStop to offer grants for NFT gaming projects. The following month, the company raised $200 million in Series C funding led by Temasek, with participation from Tencent and Animoca Brands, valuing the company at $3.5 billion. In 2022. In July, the company laid off at least 20 staff members, including core members of the Gods Unchained team. Additionally, the value of Immutable's cryptocurrency token, IMX, used for trading assets in Gods Unchained, dropped from about $11 in November 2021 to just above $1 in July 2022.

Immutable's software is used for the marketplace of Ubisoft's Might and Magic: Fates (2026).

In August 2026, Immutable launched Immutable Audience, a platform for game studios to promote their games on Steam before they are released. According to Immutable, this platform does not use blockchain technology.

== Products ==
=== Gods Unchained ===
Gods Unchained is a collectible trading card game featuring NFTs for each card, available on Android, iOS, Microsoft Windows and MacOS, Launched in 2019.

In December 2023, the Entertainment Software Rating Board (ESRB) rated Gods Unchained, along with another game, as "Adults Only 18+" (AO) due to their use of cryptocurrency to facilitate gambling. This led to a temporary removal from the Epic Games Store, though it was later reinstated after Epic Games updated its content policy.

=== Guild of Guardians ===
Guild of Guardians is a fantasy squad-based RPG developed by Immutable and Mineloader, launched in May 2024. As a blockchain game, Guild of Guardians uses NFTs and a cryptocurrency wallet for handling in-game transactions.

== See also ==
- List of blockchain games
- Play-to-earn
- Stepico Games
