= Aave =

Decentralized finance protocol

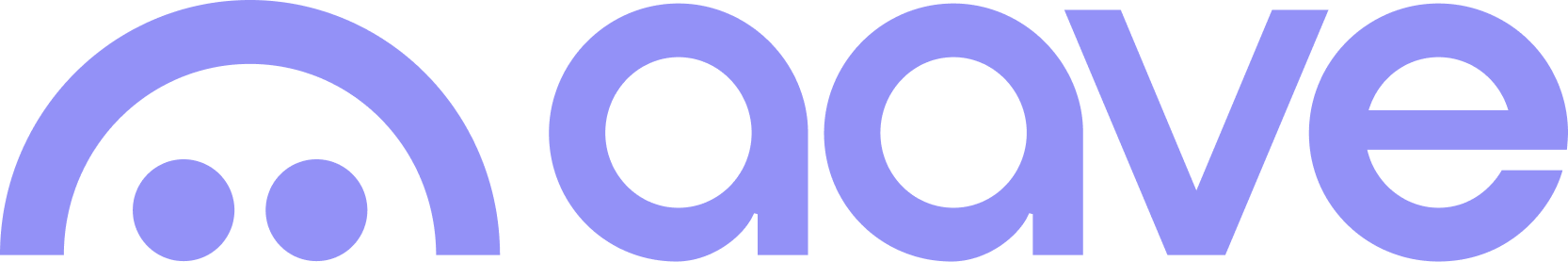

Denominations
- Code: AAVE

Development
- Original author: Stani Kulechov
- White paper: Aave Protocol Whitepaper (version 1.0)
- Development status: Active

Website
- Website: aave.com

Aave is a decentralized finance protocol (DeFi) that enables the lending and borrowing of cryptocurrencies without the involvement of intermediary financial institutions.

== History ==
Aave was founded in 2017 under the name ETHLend by Stani Kulechov, a Finnish lawyer, born in Estonia in 13.01.1991. Originally, the project was based on a peer-to-peer lending model. In January 2020, the protocol was relaunched under the new name Aave (Finnish for 'ghost') with a liquidity pool model. The associated governance token carries the same name (AAVE) and allows holders to vote on protocol changes.

In 2025, Kulechov visited Dublin to headline two separate conferences as part of Dublin Tech Week, ETH Dublin and Blockchain Ireland. At the time, the Aave lending protocol recorded €40.3 billion in net deposits.

In February 2025, Bloomberg reported that Aave remained the largest decentralized finance lending platform by deposits.

At the Reform UK conference in September 2025, Kulechov spoke alongside Zia Yusuf, the party's efficiency chief, as part of its push to embrace the cryptocurrency industry, which includes accepting donations in bitcoin.

== Functionality ==
Aave allows crypto lending and borrowing without the use of a central authority. Users can deposit various cryptocurrencies—such as Ether, USDC, or DAI—into pools. These funds are then used as collateral for issuing loans. In return, depositors receive variable interest earnings. Borrowers must provide collateral that exceeds the value of the loan.

Aave allows users to choose between variable and stable interest rates. The protocol also supports flash loans—loans that must be taken out and repaid within a single block and are therefore suitable only for experienced developers.

In 2023, Aave announced the launch of a decentralized stablecoin called GHO. This stablecoin is backed by collateral deposited within the Aave protocol.

== Governance ==
Aave is an open-source project that is governed by a decentralized community of AAVE token holders. Through a so-called DAO (Decentralized Autonomous Organization), changes to the protocol can be decided.

== Significance ==
A 2024 working paper from the Bank for International Settlements discussed agents' motivations to engage in DeFi borrowing and lending activity, using granular transaction-level data from the Aave V2 protocol.

An article in the Journal of Risk and Financial Management includes Aave as part of a broader risk assessment of DeFi platforms, examining its lending mechanisms and the governance practices employed through decentralized autonomous organizations (DAOs).

A report by the Wharton School's Blockchain and Digital Asset Project describes Aave as a case study in the structure of decentralized lending protocols, with specific reference to its introduction of flash loans.

A 2024 article published by the Stanford Journal of Blockchain Law & Policy discusses Aave's DAO-based decision-making process in the context of regulatory frameworks and decentralized system accountability.
