= Decentralized application =

Type of computer application

A decentralised application (DApp, dApp, Dapp, or dapp) is an application that can operate autonomously, typically through the use of smart contracts, that run on a blockchain or other distributed ledger system. DApps provide a function or utility to their users with less human intervention. Control over some DApps is distributed over holders of tokens that represent ownership over a DApps governance. Without any one entity controlling the system, the application is therefore decentralised.

== Definition ==
DApps are conventionally open-source. Some DApps that are fully closed-source and partially closed-source also exist. Bitcoin, the first cryptocurrency, is an example of a DApp.

== Usage ==
DApps can be classified based on whether they operate on their own block chain, or whether they operate on the block chain of another DApp.

=== Smart contracts ===
Smart contracts are programs that maintain data on a blockchain and execute operations. Multiple smart contracts can be developed for a single DApp to handle more complex operations. Over 75% of DApps are supported by a single smart contract, with the remainder using multiple smart contracts.

DApps incur fees paid to the validators of the blockchain, known as "gas", due to the cost of deploying and executing the DApp's smart contracts. The amount of gas required of a DApp's functions is dependent on the complexity of its smart contracts. A complex smart contract of a DApp that operates on the Ethereum blockchain may fail to be deployed if it costs too much gas, leading to lower throughput and longer wait times for execution.

=== Operation ===
DApps generally rely on the consensus mechanism of the blockchain or distributed ledger on which they run, rather than operating a separate consensus mechanism. Common blockchain consensus mechanisms include proof-of-work (PoW) and proof-of-stake (PoS).

In proof-of-work systems, miners expend computational work to validate blocks. In proof-of-stake systems, validators participate in block validation by staking assets.

== Characteristics ==
DApps have their backend code running on a decentralized peer-to-peer network, as opposed to typical applications where the backend code is running on centralized servers. A DApp can have frontend code and user interfaces written in any language that can make calls to its backend.

DApps have been utilized in decentralized finance (DeFi), in which dapps perform financial functions on blockchains. Empirical work on protocols such as Aave has examined whether DeFi systems are decentralized in practice by analysing transaction and control networks.

The performance of a DApp is tied to its latency, throughput, and sequential performance. Bitcoin's system for transaction validation is designed so that the average time for a block on bitcoin's blockchain to be mined is 10 minutes. Ethereum offers a reduced latency of one mined block every 12 seconds on average (called Block Time). For comparison, Visa handles approximately 10,000 transactions per second. More recent DApp projects, such as Solana, have attempted to exceed that rate.

Internet connectivity is a core dependency of blockchain systems, which includes DApps. High monetary costs also act as a barrier. Transactions of small monetary values can comprise a large proportion of the transferred amount. Greater demand for the service also leads to increased fees due to increased network traffic. This is an issue for Ethereum, which is attributed to increased network traffic caused by DApps built on the Ethereum blockchain, such as those used by Non-fungible tokens (NFTs). Transaction fees are affected by the complexity of a DApp's smart contracts, and by the particular blockchain.

== Trends ==
Empirical research on Ethereum DApps found that usage was highly concentrated: in a dataset of 995 Ethereum DApps, fewer than one fifth attracted almost all users, about 5% accounted for 80% of transactions, and 80% had fewer than 1,000 users.

A 2023 study of 197 DApps found both positive and negative utilization trends. It reported more statistically significant positive trends than negative trends overall, but DeFi accounted for a disproportionate share of negative trends, and the share of positive trend segments declined by March 2023.

Adoption remains limited by usability, users' ability to evaluate differences from conventional applications, and transaction costs.

A 2026 study in Research Policy found that open-source development activity and community interaction were positively associated with later DApp user engagement and transaction volume.

A notable early example was the DApp CryptoKitties, which congested the Ethereum network during its 2017 popularity spike. A 2019 Wall Street Journal report said that CryptoKitties and similar game DApps had struggled to retain users.
