= Timeline of the COVID-19 pandemic in India (2021) =

The following is the timeline of the COVID-19 pandemic in India from January 2021 to the May 2021. The complexity of the COVID-19 data reporting in India has been scrutinized extensively because of the disagreement between the undocumented morbidity rate and the low rates of case fatality in comparison to other countries.

Timeline of the pandemic spread across India (30 January 2020 to 3 April 2020)

Cases

Deaths

== January [2021] ==
=== 16 January ===
India began its vaccination program, with the initial focus on healthcare workers.

=== 19 January ===
Lakshadweep becomes the last region in India to report its first case.

=== 26 January ===
India reported a record low case count of around 9,100 new cases.

== February [2021] ==
The average daily new case count for India fell below 9,000 cases.

=== 22 February ===
India surpassed 11 million total cases with more than 150,000 deaths.

== March [2021] ==
=== 29 March ===
India surpassed 12 million total cases as the daily case count reached 68,020, the highest in five months.

== April [2021] ==
=== 1 April ===
Vaccinations were made available to all Indians over the age of 45.

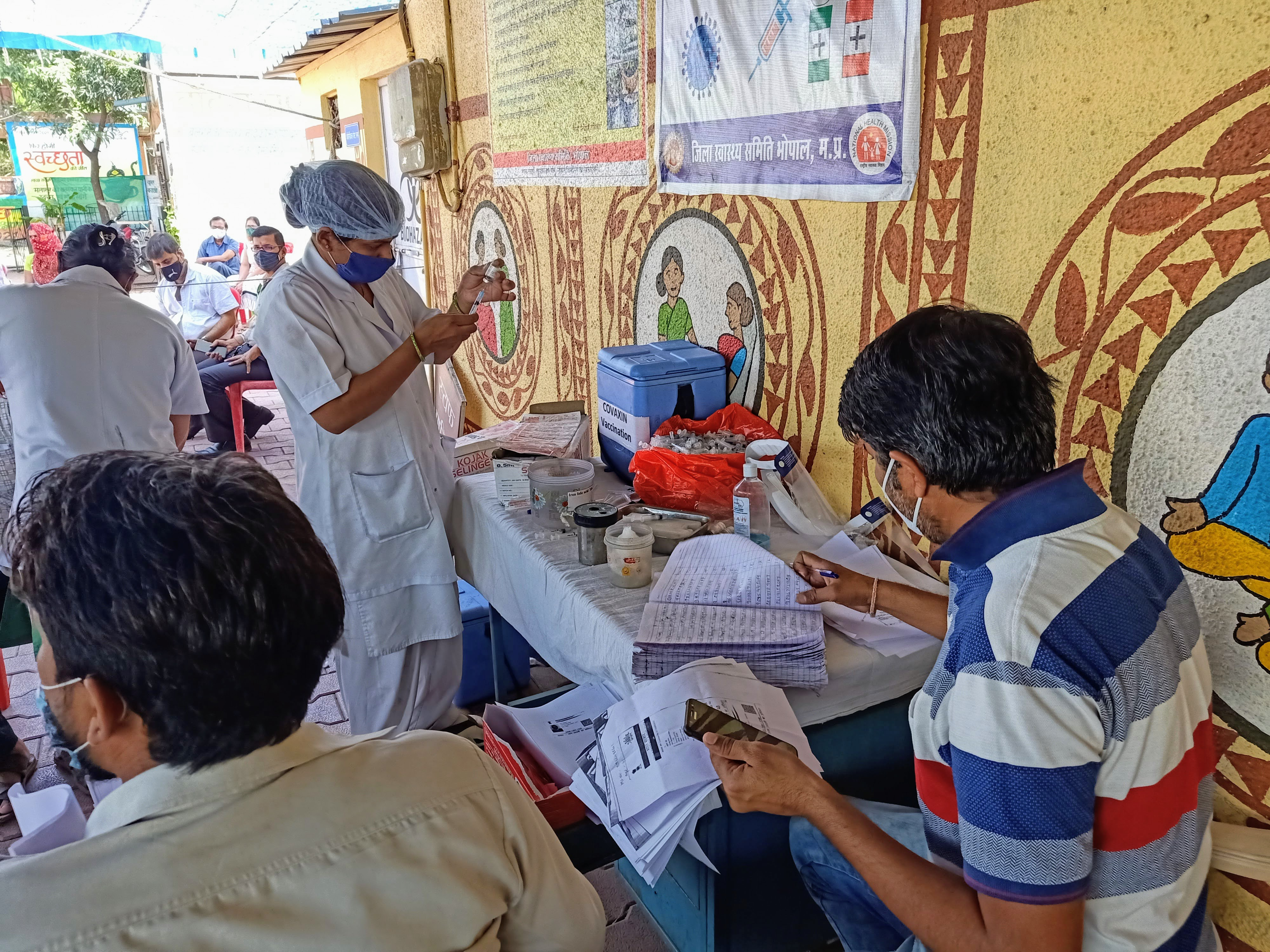
Vaccination drive for COVID prevention in Bhopal

=== 2 April ===
India reported 89,129 new cases, the most in more than six months. More the 7 million vaccines had been administered.

=== 4 April ===
In the state of Maharashtra, new restrictions were imposed in response to the growing case count. Restrictions included the closure of malls, cinemas, and places of worship.

=== 7 April ===
India's daily case count surpassed 100,000 for the first time with 103,558, surpassing the previous record of 97,894 set in September 2020. Maharashtra accounted for more than half of the total of the country with a record 57,074 new cases.

=== 8 April ===
India's Prime Minister, Narendra Modi, rejected calls to expand vaccination eligibility as the country hit a new record for daily cases with more than 125,000.

=== 9 April ===
India surpassed 13 million total cases as the country recorded another record daily case count, 131,968, and 780 new deaths. Many states, including Maharashtra, Odisha and Punjab reported vaccine shortages, and many districts in Maharashtra were forced to suspend vaccine drives.

=== 10 April ===
For the fifth time in a week, India recorded a new record number of daily cases, with 145,384 new cases. Authorities in Maharashtra imposed a weekend lockdown to help prevent the spread in the state.

=== 11 April ===
The government of India banned the export of the antiviral drug Remdesivir and its ingredients as demand skyrocketed in the country. The daily case count hit another record high of over 150,000 cases. The surge was driven farther by large religious gatherings at the Kumbh Mela and massive political rallies with little mask-wearing or social distancing.

=== 12 April ===
India officially surpassed Brazil for the second most total cases in the world with more than 11.3 million cases, behind only the United States.

=== 14 April ===
India recorded more than 200,000 new daily cases for the first time, more than double the peak of the first wave. Many hospitals around the country reported shortages of beds and supplemental oxygen.

=== 15 April ===
India surpassed 14 million total confirmed COVID infections nationwide as the country reported a record 273,810 new daily cases. In Delhi, hotels and banquet halls were being converted into makeshift hospitals as regular hospitals in the region reached capacity.

=== 17 April ===
India reported 261,500 new cases and a record 1,501 new deaths from the disease. New Delhi reported a record 25,500 new cases and saw their positivity rate reach 30%.

=== 18 April ===
India surpassed 15 million total confirmed COVID cases nationwide.

=== 19 April ===
India recorded 273,810 new COVID infections and 1,619 deaths nationwide. Crematoriums running nonstop began to have their metal parts melt, causing experts to speculate that the death total has been severely undercounted. Delhi announced a strict, six-day lockdown to help curb the spread of infections around the capital city.

=== 20 April ===
With 234,000 new cases, in addition to 1,341 new deaths, India recorded more than 1.6 million cases in the span of a week. As hospitals reached capacity, numerous reports indicated that many people died whilst awaiting treatment at and outside of hospitals or after being turned away.

=== 21 April ===
India reported 314,664 new infections, breaking the record for the most cases in a single day by any country since the pandemic began, surpassing the United States' previous record.

=== 23 April ===
14 COVID patients died when a fire broke out in an intensive care unit inside a Mumbai hospital. Dozens of patients at multiple hospitals died after running out of oxygen as the oxygen shortage increased around the country.

The country surpassed 16 million total cases and reported 332,730 new cases.

=== 24 April ===
India reported a record 346,786 new cases and 2,624 deaths.

=== 25 April ===
During a phone call with Indian national security adviser Ajit Doval, United States White House national security adviser Jake Sullivan said that the US pledged to provide medical aid to India despite the US previously banning the export of raw materials necessary of vaccines. India was running critically low on medical oxygen, COVID vaccines, and hospital beds.

For the fourth day in a row, India set a new record for most cases in a single day by any country with nearly 350,000 new infections.

The Indian government ordered social media platforms Facebook, Instagram, and Twitter to remove dozens of posts that were critical of the government and its handling of the pandemic.

=== 26 April ===
India surpassed 17 million total cases just three days after surpassing 16 million. India reported 352,991 new cases, a new record. The United Kingdom, European Union, and Pakistan joined the US in pledging to provide critical medical supplies to the country. More than 109 million Indians had received at least one vaccination and 17 million were fully vaccinated.

=== 27 April ===
India's health ministry reported 362,757 new cases and 3,285 deaths, marking the seventh consecutive day that the country reported more than 300,000 new cases and the first time that more than 3,000 deaths were reported in a day.

=== 28 April ===
United States president Joe Biden pledged to deliver US$100 million worth of supplies to India, including oxygen cylinders, concentrators, and generation units, personal protective equipment (including masks), vaccine ingredients, and COVID tests.

The country surpassed 200,000 total deaths from the pandemic as experts warn the number are likely woefully undercounted. India reported 360,960 new cases and 3,293 new deaths.

=== 29 April ===
India surpassed 18 million cases three days after passing 17 India reported a new record of 379,257 new infections and 386,453 new deaths. The United States formally advised against travelling to India and advised US citizens to leave India "as soon as it is safe to do so."

=== 30 April ===
India reported 386,453 new infections and 3,498 deaths.

== May [2021] ==
=== 1 May ===
India officially expanded eligibility to all adults over the age of 18, but at least seven regions are already experiencing vaccine shortages.

The country reported its highest ever single-day case count of 401,993, the first time the number has eclipsed 400,000 and the tenth consecutive day it has passed 300,000. There were also 3,523 newly reported deaths, bringing the total to 211,853. With the addition of these numbers, the country officially surpassed 19 million total cases.

=== 2 May ===
India reported a record 3,689 new deaths and 392,488 new cases.

=== 3 May ===
India reported 368,060 new cases nationwide as well as 3,417 deaths.

=== 4 May ===
India surpassed 20 million total cases since the start of the pandemic. The country reported 357,229 new confirmed cases and 3,449 new deaths.

=== 5 May ===
India reported a record 3,780 additional deaths and 382,315 additional confirmed cases, and experts warned that the true number of deaths could be as much as ten times higher than what has been reported.

=== 6 May ===
The country reported 412,262 new confirmed cases, the most for a single day for any country in the world since the pandemic began. With this record-breaking increase, India officially passed 21 million total confirmed cases with 21,077,410. 3,980 new deaths were also reported. India's demand for supplemental oxygen had increased seven times over in the last month.

=== 7 May ===
India reported a new record high for daily confirmed cases with 414,188 and 3,915 deaths. In the past seven days, the country has reported more than 2.7 million new cases and nearly 26,000 new deaths. Congress leader Rahul Gandhi wrote a letter to Prime Minister Narendra Modi imploring him to impose a national lockdown to help snuff the surge.

=== 8 May ===
India reported a record number of new deaths with 4,187. The country also reported 401,078 new confirmed cases, marking the third consecutive day of 400,000 or more cases. CBS News reported that people in India were dying faster than they could be cremated or buried, leading to makeshift crematoriums appearing around the country.

=== 9 May ===
India reported 403,405 new confirmed cases, the fourth day in a row with more than 400,000 cases, along with 4,077 new deaths. The country officially surpassed 22 million total confirmed cases.

=== 10 May ===
India's new daily case and death count dropped slightly to 366,161 and 3,754, respectively. Calls for a nationwide lockdown intensified, with Dr. Anthony Fauci, Chief Medical Advisor to the President of the US, joining in as well.

=== 11 May ===
India reported 329,942 new confirmed cases, the lowest number of new cases since 26 April, along with 3,876 deaths. The SARS-CoV-2 variant known as B.1.617, the triple-mutant spreading mainly in India, was declared a "variant of concern" by the World Health Organization, indicating that it is perceived as a "global threat."

=== 12 May ===
India reported 4,205 new deaths from the virus, the most in a 24-hour span since the pandemic began for any country in the world, pushing its death total past 250,000. The total number of confirmed cases surpassed 23 million, with 23,340,938 cases being confirmed since the start of the pandemic.

It was reported that many COVID-positive patients were being infected with a potentially fatal "black fungus," with at least 300 cases in the state of Gujarat.

=== 13 May ===
India reported another 362,727 new confirmed cases and 4,120 new deaths. Government advisor V. K. Paul stated that more than two billion doses of COVID vaccines would be made available between August and December 2021, including 750 million produced by Astrazeneca and 550 million Covaxin, made by Bharat Biotech.

Vitalik Buterin donated US$1.14 billion worth of cryptocurrency to the India COVID-Crypto Relief Fund, including 500 Ether and over 50 trillion Shiba Tokens.

=== 14–17 May ===
India's daily case count fell for three consecutive days, with 343,144 on 14 May, 326,098 on 15 May, 311,170 on 16 May, and 281,386 on 17 May, the lowest daily total since 19 April. Deaths stayed relatively steady, with 4,000, 3,890, 4,077, and 4,106 new deaths on the same days, respectively.

The country surpassed 24 million total cases on 14 May.

Tropical Cyclone Tauktae made landfall on 17 May near Una, Gujarat in Gujarat, hampering efforts to combat the virus.

=== 18 May ===
India surpassed 25 million total cases, recording another 263,533 cases and a record 4,329 new deaths.

=== 19 May ===
In addition to 267,334 new cases, India had the deadliest day since the start of the pandemic for any country, with 4,529 COVID-related deaths.

=== 20 May ===
India reported an additional 276,110 cases and 3,874 deaths.

=== 21 May ===
India surpassed 26 million total cases after reporting an additional 259,551 and 4,209 deaths.

=== 22–23 May ===
India's new case count continued to fall steadily, with the country reporting 257,299 and 240,842 new cases on 22 and 23 May, respectively. The country also reported 4,194 and 3,741 new deaths.

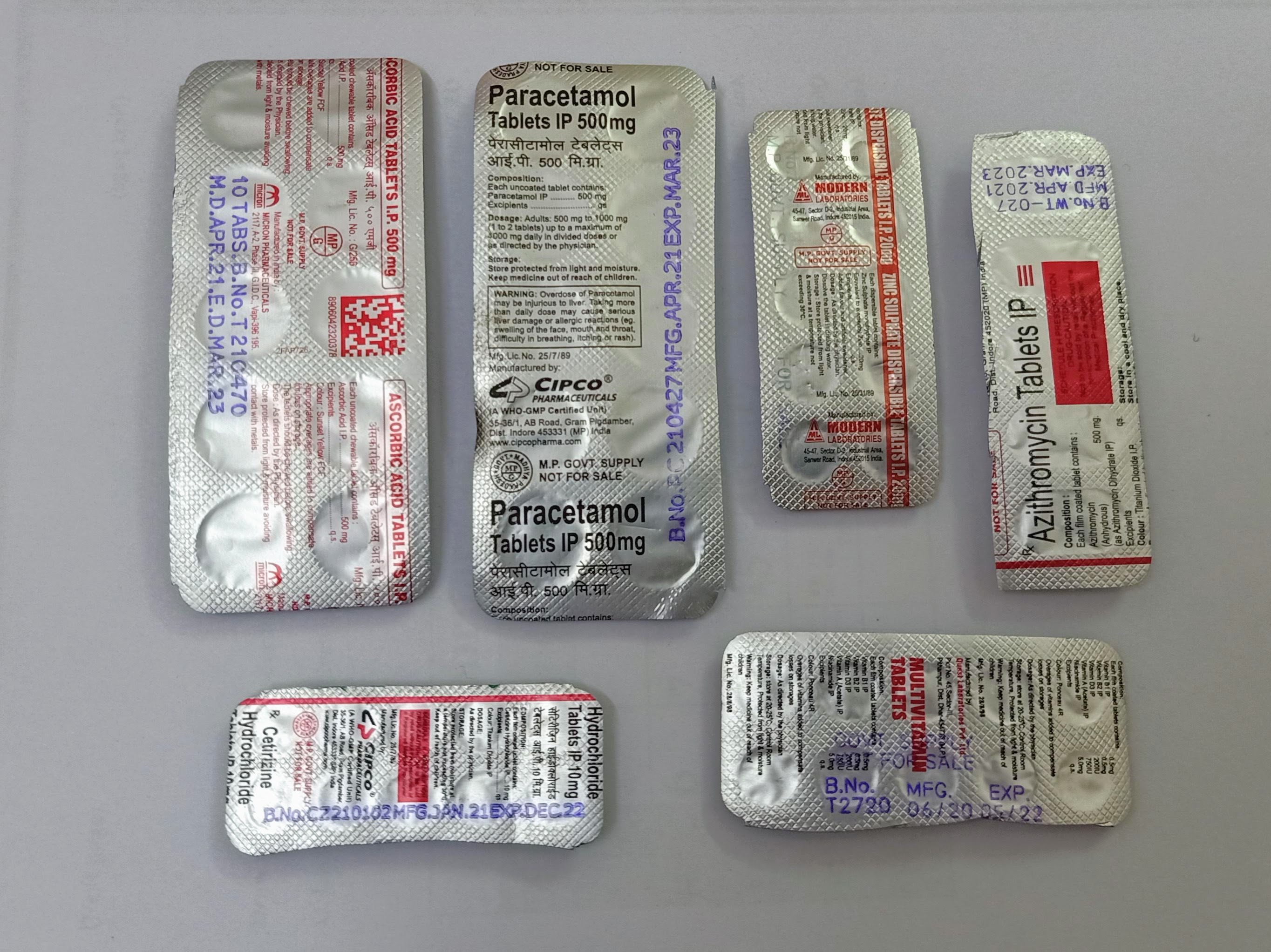
Free medicine for COVID-19 provided by Govt of Madhya Pradesh

=== 24 May ===
India officially surpassed 300,000 total deaths from the virus, reporting an additional 4,454 deaths, the second highest total since the pandemic began, and 222,315 new cases. A total of 8,800 cases of black fungus had been reported nationwide among COVID patients.

=== 25 May ===
India reported an additional 196,427 positive cases, the first time under 200,000 since 13 April, 42 days prior. The country also reported 3,511 new deaths, the lowest since 3 May.

=== 26 May ===
India surpassed 27 million total cases, adding another 208,921 new cases 4,157 new deaths.

=== 27–30 May ===
India's daily case count fell steadily, from 211,298 to 165,553 by 30 May. The daily death count fell as alongside the case count, falling from 3,847 on 27 May to 3,460 on 30 May.
