= Anatoly Yakovenko =

Ukrainian-American programmer

Toly Yakovenko
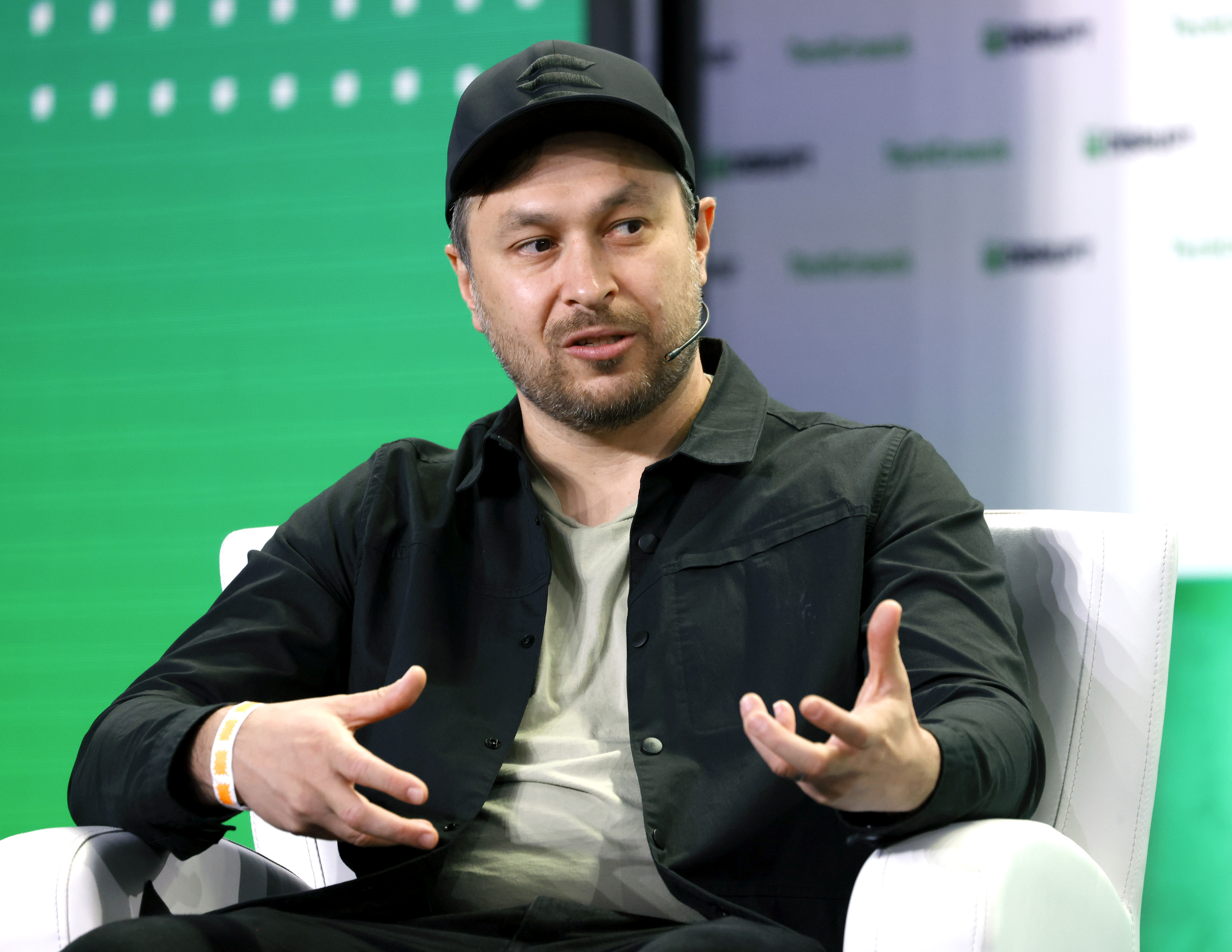
- Born: Anatoly Yakovenko; 1979 or 1980 (age 45–46); Soviet Ukraine (now Ukraine)
- Education: Computer science
- Alma mater: University of Illinois Urbana-Champaign
- Known for: Solana (blockchain platform), proposing proof of history (PoH)
- Scientific career
- Fields: Digital contracts, digital currencies

Anatoly Yakovenko (also known as Toly Yakovenko) is a Ukrainian-born software engineer and entrepreneur who co-founded the Solana blockchain platform.

== Early life ==
In the early 1990s, Yakovenko moved to the United States from Ukraine as a child and learned to program as a teenager. He graduated from the University of Illinois Urbana-Champaign with a B.S. in computer science.

Yakovenko worked for more than a decade at Qualcomm as an engineer working on wireless and distributed systems. Since 2016, he has worked as an engineer at Mesosphere, a company that develops software for data centers, and at Dropbox

== Career ==
=== Solana ===
In 2017, Yakovenko began outlining an approach he later described as proof of history (PoH), a method intended to create an ordered record of events to support faster consensus on a blockchain network. Yakovenko sought to address the blockchain trilemma of throughput, decentralization, and security by combining a proof of stake (PoS) design with a mechanism he called proof of history. He described PoH as assigning timestamps within the network so validators spend less time establishing the timing and ordering of transactions, enabling faster "time consensus" while maintaining a decentralized validation process. He went on to co-found Solana Labs with other engineers, and the project was later renamed Solana after an earlier name conflicted with another blockchain project.

In 2022, a putative class action filed in the U.S. District Court for the Northern District of California named Yakovenko and Kyle Samani, alleging violations connected to token-related offerings and disclosure. In 2024 the court denied defendants' motion to compel arbitration and noted that plaintiffs had voluntarily dismissed, without prejudice, their claims against Yakovenko and the Solana Foundation; the case proceeded against remaining defendants.

== Publications ==
- Yakovenko, Anatoly. Solana: A new architecture for a high performance blockchain (PDF) (Report). Solana.
- Yakovenko, Anatoly. "Proof of History: A Clock for Blockchain". Solana.

== See also ==
- List of people in blockchain technology
- Solana (blockchain platform)
- Vitalik Buterin
