= Eatherly =

Eatherly is an English surname. It is believed to come from an Old English name either referring to a man native to an area or more likely, a man living near a clearing in the woods or a meadow. It is commonly found in the American state of Tennessee.

Notable people with the surname Eatherly include:

- Dalton Eatherly (born 1997), American livestreamer better known by his online alias Chud The Builder
- Claude Eatherly (1918–1978), US Army officer involved in the atomic bombing of Hiroshima
