= Chud the Builder =

American livestreamer (born 1997)

- Born: Dalton Levi Eatherly; June 27, 1997 (age 29); Clarksville, Tennessee, U.S

Kick information
- Channel: ChudTheBuilder
- Years active: 2025–2026
- Genre: IRL streams

X information
- Handle: @ChudTheBuilder
- Display name: ChudTheBuilder
- Years active: 2024–present
- Followers: 229 thousand
- Criminal information
- Status: Awaiting trial
- Criminal charge: 1) Attempted first-degree murder 2) Employing a firearm during a dangerous felony 3) Aggravated assault 4) Reckless endangerment with a deadly weapon 5) Theft of services 6) Disorderly conduct 7) Resisting arrest 8) Harassment
- Last updated: May 15, 2026

Dalton Levi Eatherly (born June 27, 1997), better known as Chud the Builder, (Note: Stylized as ChudTheBuilder) is an American livestreamer who is known for his confrontational IRL streams in Tennessee. Eatherly's online persona, characterized by frequent use of racial slurs and harassment directed at Black people, has led to public condemnation, platform suspensions, and legal controversies. He received national media attention in 2026 following a shooting outside a courthouse in Clarksville, Tennessee, which resulted in Eatherly being charged with attempted murder.

== Career ==
In 2024 or early 2025, Eatherly was involved in a road rage incident with a Black woman, whose daughter later alleged that he had called them "the n-word". The resulting local backlash reportedly led to Eatherly losing his job at a construction company. Eatherly later stated that the incident motivated him to begin creating retaliatory online content.

Eatherly began livestreaming on Kick and posting on X under the alias "ChudTheBuilder". His content primarily consisted of IRL streams, and he described himself online as a "free speech patriot". His livestreams became known for their confrontational and ragebait-oriented style, frequently involving interactions with strangers in public settings, consistently featuring the use of racial slurs and dog whistles directed at Black people, whom he often referred to as "chimps". He displayed his firearm during several livestreams, and on social media, Eatherly implied that eventually one of his confrontations would lead to the death of a Black person. Multiple news outlets described Eatherly's content as racist.

Clips from his streams were widely circulated on platforms including TikTok and YouTube. In early May 2026, a video involving Eatherly went viral in which he appeared to spray a chemical agent at a Black individual while shouting racial slurs after the person knocked his hat off. By 2026, Eatherly had gained a following in some far-right circles, leading to an appearance on Infowars and an interview with Gavin McInnes. However, his racist rhetoric also was criticized by some right-wing commentators, including white nationalist Nick Fuentes.

In April 2026, Eatherly was suspended from Kick over public harassment. The suspension, initially issued for three days, was later extended indefinitely. Following the unsuccessful appeal of his ban, he moved to the livestreaming platform Pump, where every content creator receives a personal meme coin.

== Arrests ==
=== Arrest in Clarksville ===
On November 18, 2025, Eatherly was arrested, in Clarksville, Tennessee, on a harassment charge.

=== Arrest in Nashville ===
On May 11, 2026, Eatherly was arrested after allegedly refusing to pay for a meal at a Nashville steakhouse and directing racial slurs at employees the previous day. Police stated that Eatherly attempted to resist arrest. While in custody, Eatherly claimed that he was interviewed by an FBI counterterrorism unit with regard to alleged links to the Goyim Defense League. He was later released on a $5,000 bond, with a hearing scheduled for July 17.

=== Montgomery County courthouse shooting ===
On the afternoon of May 13, 2026, Eatherly was scheduled to appear in Montgomery County court over an alleged $3,000 debt owed to a credit company. Outside the courthouse, he became involved in an altercation with a Black man identified as Joshua Fox. During the confrontation, Eatherly allegedly drew a handgun from his jacket pocket and fired multiple shots at Fox. Reports also stated that Eatherly accidentally shot himself in the arm during the incident.

Police responded to the scene and Eatherly was arrested and charged with attempted murder, employing a firearm during a dangerous felony, aggravated assault, and reckless endangerment with a deadly weapon. His bail was set at $1.25 million, but was later lowered to $1 million. Following the shooting, Eatherly livestreamed himself speaking with first responders, during which he claimed that he had been assaulted by Fox and acted in self-defense.

Eatherly had set up a GiveSendGo fundraiser after he had lost employment. After the shooting, he had raised more than $150,000 by May 15, 2026. The value of his meme coin also increased significantly after the shooting. Commentary surrounding the incident frequently focused on Tennessee's stand-your-ground laws, with some supporters arguing that Eatherly's actions were legally justified.

The sheriff's department was criticized by local Tennesseans for not acting on prior concerns with Eatherly. The Democratic Party affiliate in Montgomery County described him as an individual who had sought notoriety as a local White supremacist. In the aftermath of the shooting, several commentators and publications cited the incident as an example of the broader growth of online racism, ragebait content, and engagement farming. In a June 2026 hearing, a judge in Nashville revoked his bond in that case.

Around August 10, Eatherly was released from jail after 10 bail bond companies each posted $100,000, fulfilling his $1 million bond. The bail was secured by Finnish entrepreneur and poker player Ossi Ketola.

== Personal life ==
According to Eatherly, he received death threats for his posts. He later claimed that his son's mother planned to change the child's name legally to avoid association with him.
