= Haliey Welch =

American internet personality (born 2003/04)

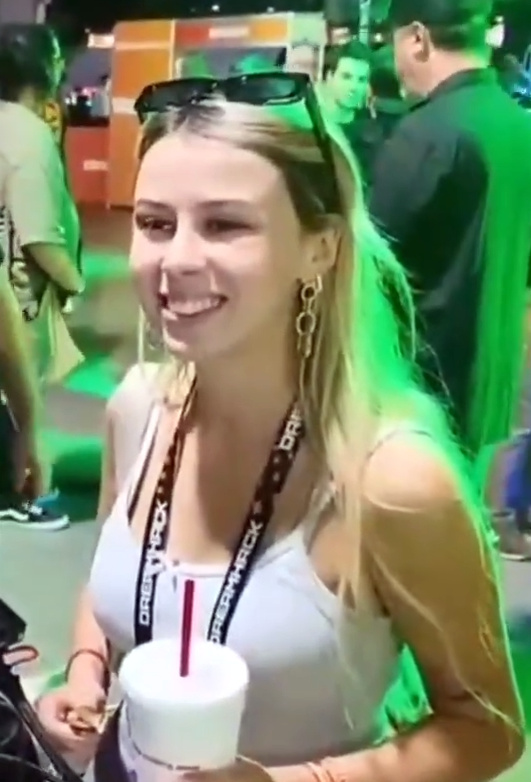
- Welch in 2024
- Born: Haliey Aliene Welch; 2003 or 2004 (age 22–23); United States
- Other name: Hawk Tuah Girl
- Occupation: Internet personality
- Years active: 2024–present
- Known for: Viral interview and catchphrase

Instagram information
- Page: Hay_welch
- Followers: 2 million (November 18, 2026)

TikTok information
- Page: Hay_welch
- Followers: 1.7 million (November 18, 2026)

YouTube information
- Channel: Talk Tuah Podcast with Haliey Welch
- Years active: 2024–present
- Genres: Talk, interview, social commentary
- Subscribers: 191,000
- Views: 13 million
- Last updated: November 18, 2026

Haliey Aliene Welch (/ˈheɪli/ HAY-lee; born 2003 or 2004), commonly known online as the Hawk Tuah Girl, is an American internet personality. She became an internet meme after being interviewed in a viral 2024 TikTok video in which she used a catchphrase, hawk tuah, an onomatopoeia for spitting on a penis as a form of oral sex, specifically fellatio. She is also known for her subsequent podcast, Talk Tuah, and a cryptocurrency coin which faced criticism following release.

== Early and personal life ==
Welch is from Belfast, Tennessee, and worked in a bedspring factory prior to internet fame. As of 2024, she lives in Nashville, Tennessee, with her paternal grandmother, who raised her. On Howie Mandel Does Stuff, a podcast hosted by Jewish-Canadian comedian Howie Mandel, Welch performed a five-minute DNA saliva test live which revealed she allegedly had 97.7% Ashkenazi Jewish ancestry. The test's efficacy was questioned by the Jewish website Jewlicious. Welch herself claims no knowledge of her family's heritage. In 2024, Welch claimed in a conversation with Whitney Cummings that her mother, with whom she is no longer in contact, was a crack user and she herself was born a crack baby.

== Hawk tuah ==
External videos
- Interview with Haliey Welch, by Tim & Dee TV, published June 24, 2024.

On June 11, 2024, a vox pop YouTube channel, Tim & Dee TV, owned by Tim Dickerson and DeArius Marlow, released a video featuring an interview with Welch in the Broadway district of Nashville, Tennessee, United States. Welch and another woman approached Dickerson and Marlow and asked to be interviewed. The interview began with what Dickerson and Marlow considered tamer questions, such as "What makes you wifey material?" Eventually, according to Dickerson and Marlow, Welch encouraged Marlow to "spice up the questions". Marlow responded by asking, "What's one move in bed that makes a man go crazy every time?" Welch's reply, in a strong Southern accent was, "You gotta give 'em that 'hawk tuah' (Note: /ˌhɔːk ˈtuːə/ HAWK TOO-ə) and spit on that thang", referring to spitting on someone's penis as a form of fellatio, for lubricatory purposes.

The next day, Marlow uploaded the clip to TikTok, and almost immediately other accounts across social media began reposting the video after scrubbing off the "Tim and Dee TV" watermark. Dickerson and Marlow estimated that they filed at least fifty copyright claims in the days after they first published the clip. The original video had gone viral, receiving millions of views across TikTok, Instagram, and YouTube, spawning remixes and remakes of the original audio, and gaining Welch the nickname Hawk Tuah Girl. The video and the phrase turned into a meme.

=== Popularity ===
Initially, Welch was mortified that her clip had gone so viral. Welch said, "The first week of it, I was so embarrassed ... I wouldn't come out of my house. I went to work, but that's about it. Other than that, I didn't go anywhere. But I went from being embarrassed to living in the moment." She had seen vendors selling unofficial regalia of her viral moment and decided to capitalize on the moment herself. She said "If everyone else is making money off of it, I might as well, too." Ultimately, Welch created an Instagram account and soon gained a sizable social media following and media attention. Dickerson and Marlow indicated they were happy for Welch but were upset for not receiving credit for Welch's fame.

She quit her job at the bed spring factory on June 27, 2024, and partnered with a local apparel brand to begin selling Hawk Tuah merchandise, earning over $65,000 within a couple of weeks. On June 29, Welch joined Zach Bryan on stage during his concert in Nashville, Tennessee, to perform Bryan's song "Revival". A few days later, Welch joined Shaquille O'Neal during his DJ set in Nashville. On July 2, Welch signed for representation with The Penthouse. On August 15, she threw the ceremonial first pitch of a New York Mets game. On December 11, she was featured on a comedic segment of the late-night television show Jimmy Kimmel Live! In 2025, Welch announced an upcoming documentary, DocTuah, about her rise to fame.

== Career ==
=== Talk Tuah ===
Welch premiered a podcast with Jake Paul's company Betr, Talk Tuah, on September 3, 2024. It has featured guests from the start; the first episode features comedian Whitney Cummings. From there, the show has featured a guest on almost every episode, including rapper and singer-songwriter Wiz Khalifa, business mogul Mark Cuban, and Dance Moms star JoJo Siwa. In September 2024, a fake screenshot of an NPR article went viral on Twitter, claiming that former President Donald Trump had canceled a guest appearance on the podcast because of an assassination attempt in Florida. In November 2024, a fake screenshot of a CNN article went viral on Instagram, claiming that more than 75,000 of the votes counted in the 2024 United States presidential election were write-ins for "Hawk Tuah" and "Talk Tuah."

=== App ===
On November 14, 2024, Welch released an AI-powered dating advice app named Pookie Tools. To build the app, Welch partnered with Ben Ganz, founder of Ultimate AI Studio, an AI automation platform.

=== Meme coin scandal ===
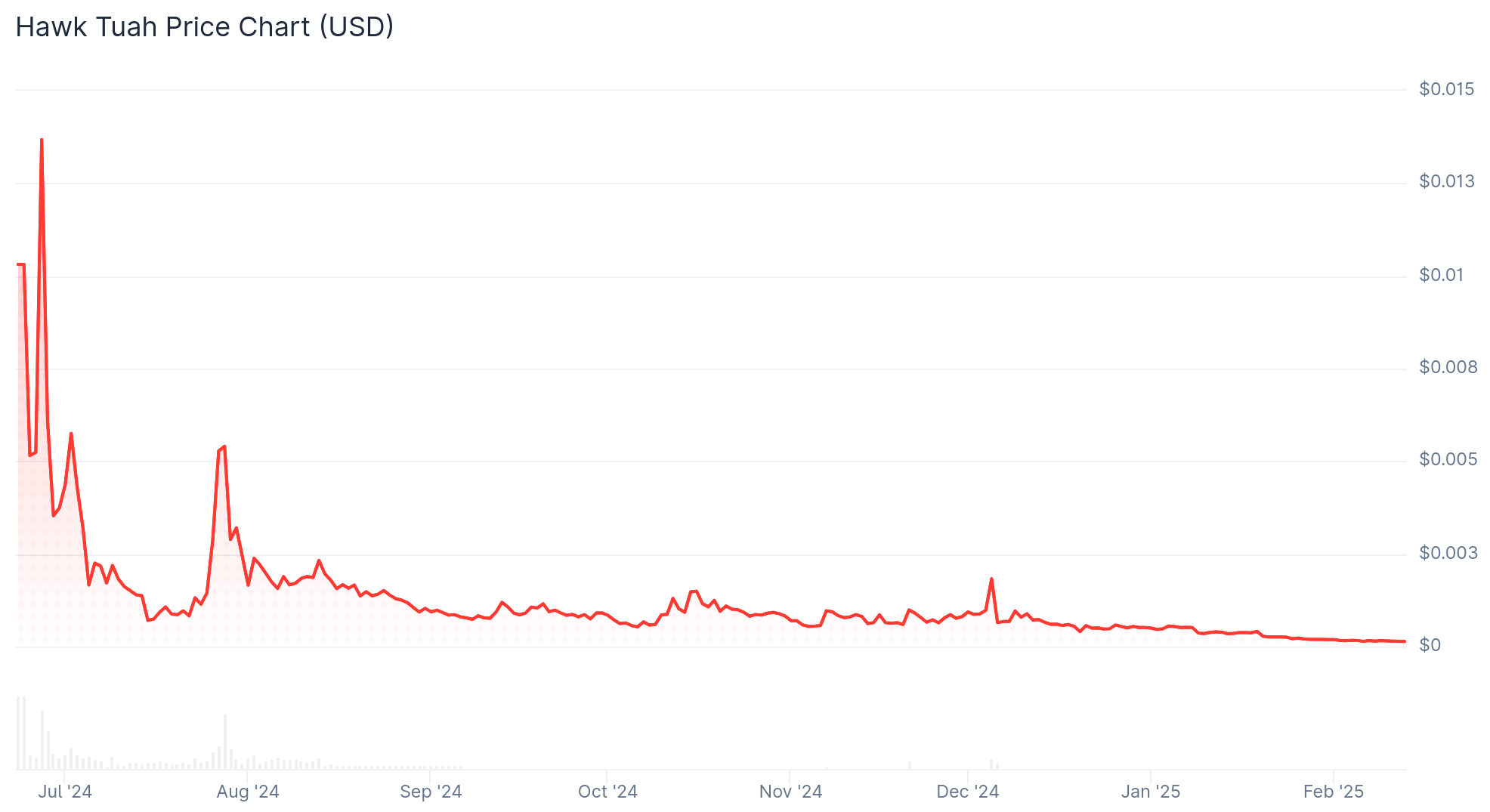
Price chart of $HAWK token until February 2025

In December 2024, Welch released a cryptocurrency meme coin on Solana called $HAWK token. The meme coin reached a market capitalization of nearly $500 million before plummeting to $25 million, with at least one investor filing a complaint with the U.S. Securities and Exchange Commission. This led to Welch and her team being accused of performing a pump-and-dump scheme and the coin being accused of being an exit scam — including from cryptocurrency journalist Coffeezilla, who also accused Welch and her team of insider trading. Welch's team has denied the accusations.

Later that month, a lawsuit was filed against the $HAWK creators in the U.S.District Court for the Eastern District of New York for unlawfully promoting and selling cryptocurrency that was allegedly never properly registered. Welch, who was not named in the suit, responded to the litigation, saying that she "take[s] this situation extremely seriously" and pledging to be "fully cooperating with and am committed to assisting" the legal parties involved. Welch later said she only "got paid a marketing fee" for $HAWK token and never made a "dime from the coin itself."

== Filmography ==
=== Television ===
Year	Title	Role	Notes	Ref.
2025	Chad Powers	Herself	Episode: "1st Quarter"	
