= BitFuFu =

Bitcoin company

BitFuFu Inc.
- Company type: Public
- Traded as: Nasdaq: FUFU
- Industry: Bitcoin mining
- Founded: 2020
- Founder: Leo Lu
- Headquarters: Singapore
- Area served: Global
- Services: Self-mining; Cloud mining; Miner sales; Miner hosting services; Mining software (BitFuFuOS); Mining pool services
- Revenue: US$198.2 million (2022); US$284.1 million (2023); US$463.3 million (2024)
- Total assets: $467.6 million, including 1,792 Bitcoin (as of June 30, 2025)
- Website: bitfufu.com

BitFuFu Inc. (Nasdaq: FUFU) is a Bitcoin miner and mining services innovator headquartered in Singapore.

The company acquires and holds Bitcoin through self-mining as its long-term asset allocation strategy, while providing retail and institutional clients with one-stop mining services such as cloud mining, miner sales, and miner hosting.

In March 2024, following a SPAC merger, BitFuFu became publicly listed on Nasdaq under the ticker symbol FUFU.

== Operation ==
=== Self-mining ===
BitFuFu conducts self-mining by acquiring and developing mining facilities, and deploying company-owned mining machines. The company retains the mined Bitcoin as its long-term holding strategy. In 2024, revenue from BitFuFu's self-mining operations increased by 57% to US$158 million. As of June 30, 2025, the company held 1,792 Bitcoins, ranking sixth among the Bitcoin treasury companies in Asia and 24th globally.

In January 2025, BitFuFu announced that it had entered into a multi-year framework agreement with Bitmain, spanning 2024 to 2026, which grants the company the exclusive right—without obligation—to purchase up to 80,000 new S-series mining machines, including models such as the S21 XP and S21 Pro.

In October 2024, BitFuFu signed to acquire an 80 MW mining facility in Ethiopia and in September and November of the same year, the company entered into long-term leases on two U.S. mining facilities (totaling 33 MW) with purchase options. In February 2025, the company finalized a deal to acquire a 51 MW Bitcoin mining facility in Oklahoma, U.S.

As of June 30, 2025, BitFuFu managed a total hashrate of 36.2 EH/s and had a combined global power capacity of 728 MW across five continents.

=== Cloud mining ===
BitFuFu offers cloud mining services to both institutional and retail customers. Users can purchase cloud mining contracts via BitFuFu's mobile application or website, selecting desired hashrate and service duration to earn Bitcoin rewards, without the need to buy or manage mining hardware directly.

BitFuFu is the world's largest cloud mining platform. In 2024, its cloud mining revenue increased by 52% to US$271 million. As of June 30, 2025, the platform had over 623,000 of registered users.

=== Miner sales ===
BitFuFu sells Bitcoin miners to clients, with the ability to source specific models based on clients’ specifications. Clients may opt to have the equipment hosted at BitFuFu's mining facilities, which provide standardized infrastructure, including rack space, power supply, network connectivity, and routine maintenance services.

=== Miner hosting ===
BitFuFu offers miner hosting services, allowing users to deploy their miners at the company's self-operated facilities. The platform handles installation, pool connectivity, and ongoing operational maintenance, eliminating the need for clients to construct dedicated infrastructure or perform daily upkeep. Clients retain full ownership of all mining rewards generated during the hosting period, and ownership of the equipment remains with the user upon completion of the service term.

=== Mining pool ===
BitFuFuPool is a private-label Bitcoin mining pool launched by BitFuFu in December 2024. It is accessible to users through the BitFuFu app when purchasing cloud mining products or miner services. The pool offers commission rates as low as 0%.

=== Mining software ===
In January 2025, BitFuFu launched BitFuFuOS, mining optimization software supporting customizable overclocking and underclocking modes. The system enables real-time adjustment of power and frequency to adapt to varying environmental conditions, with potential mining output increases of up to 20%.

=== Technology ===
BitFuFu's proprietary Aladdin system is designed to manage ultra-large-scale hash power, dynamically allocating hashrate between self-mining and cloud mining operations based on supply-demand conditions. Aladdin consists of three major components: FuFu Sentry for real-time monitoring and operational automation, FuFu Proxy System for precision hash routing between miners and pools, and FuFu Dispatcher Engine for stable protocol execution and hash distribution.

== History ==
BitFuFu was founded in December 2020 by Leo Lu. In late 2022, BitFuFu announced plans for a SPAC merger, and in early 2024, the company completed a business combination with Arisz Acquisition Corp. Following this merger, BitFuFu's Class A shares and warrants began trading on Nasdaq on March 1, 2024, under the ticker FUFU and FUFUW.

In March 2025, BitFuFu was announced as one of the largest corporate holdings of the new Bitwise Bitcoin Standard Corporations ETF, representing about 4.0% of the ETF's assets.

In May 2025, the company sponsored the Bitcoin 2025 conference in Las Vegas.
