= SimpleX Chat =

Encrypted messaging application

- Developer: SimpleX Chat Ltd
- Release: 12 January 2022; 4 years ago
- Stable release: v7.1.4 / November 15, 2026; 5 days ago
- Preview release: v7.1.0-beta.10 / November 3, 2026; 17 days ago
- Written in: Haskell; Kotlin (Android); Swift (iOS)
- Operating system: Android 8.0 or later; iOS 15 or later; Windows (desktop and console); macOS (desktop and console); Linux distribution (Flatpak, AppImage, .deb, console)
- Available in: 26 languages
- List of languages English, Arabic, Bulgarian, Catalan, Chinese (Simplified), Czech, Dutch, Finnish, French, German, Hebrew, Hungarian, Indonesian, Italian, Japanese, Lithuanian, Persian, Polish, Portuguese (Brazil), Romanian, Russian, Spanish, Thai, Turkish, Ukrainian, Vietnamese
- Type: Encrypted voice calling, video calling and instant messaging
- License: GNU Affero General Public License
- Website: simplex.chat; isdb4l77sjqoy2qq7ipum6x3at6hyn3jmxfx4zdhc72ufbmuq4ilwkqd.onion ^{(Accessing link help)}
- Repository: github.com/simplex-chat/simplex-chat; git.simplex.chat/simplex-chat/simplex-chat (Mirror)

SimpleX Chat is a free and open-source cross-platform end-to-end encrypted instant messaging app and console application. The app does not require phone number, email address, or any other external identification.

SimpleX applications are available for Android, iOS, Windows, macOS operating systems, and various Linux distributions.

== History ==
In July 2024, the American cybersecurity firm Trail of Bits conducted an independent security audit of the SimpleX Chat's cryptographic protocols.

Following the arrest of Pavel Durov in France in 2024 many extremist groups fled from Telegram to SimpleX due to heightened privacy concerns.

=== Funding ===
SimpleX Chat is developed by SimpleX Chat Ltd, a commercial company. The project began full-time development in 2021, initially supported by angel investors including Portman Wills and Peter Briffett. In July 2022, it raised approximately $370,000 in pre-seed funding, including from Village Global.

In August 2024, SimpleX Chat announced a $1.3 million pre-seed investment led by Jack Dorsey, with participation from Asymmetric Capital Partners. The company has stated that user donations play a significant role, covering infrastructure costs and supporting development, with collective donations exceeding $25,000 as of 2023.

In November 2025, the co-founder of Ethereum, Vitalik Buterin, donated 128 ethers (approx. $380,000) to SimpleX Chat.

=== Russia ===
In September 2024 the app was blocked by Russian authorities (Roskomnadzor). In September 2025, Tagansky court of Moscow fined the owning company SimpleX Chat Ltd. for "failure to fulfill the obligations of an instant messaging service provider," a violation of the law requiring every messaging application to collaborate with state authorities and, if requested, provide encryption keys for certain communications.

== Features ==
SimpleX Chat provides quantum-resistant end-to-end encryption for one-to-one chats, group conversations (called "secret groups"), and voice/video calls, using a double-ratchet protocol similar to Signal's, with an additional encryption layer per message. It requires no phone number, email, or personal details, instead using one-time invitation links, long-term invitation links (can be used more than one time) or QR codes for connections and temporary anonymous queue identifiers for message routing over the SimpleX Messaging Protocol (SMP). Unlimited creation of profiles is supported (Incognito or not).

All user data is stored locally in an encrypted database on the device, with messages temporarily held on SMP relay servers and deleted after delivery. Additional privacy features include "Incognito mode," which generates a random profile name and prevents sharing of the user's actual profile name or image with new contacts, as well as a two-day expiration limit for file downloads, after which files become unavailable.
