= Pinewood Derby (South Park) =

- South Park episode
- Episode no.: Season 13; Episode 6
- Directed by: Trey Parker
- Written by: Trey Parker
- Production code: 1306
- Original air date: April 15, 2009

Episode chronology
| ← Previous "Fishsticks" | Next → "Fatbeard" |
- South Park season 13

"Pinewood Derby" is the sixth episode of the thirteenth season of the American animated television series South Park. The 187th overall episode of the series, it originally aired on Comedy Central in the United States on April 15, 2009. In the episode, Randy helps Stan cheat in a pinewood derby race, which inadvertently leads to the discovery of alien life. When an alien gangster visits South Park and the residents come into possession of his stolen "space cash", they decide to keep it for themselves and hide it from alien police officers who are looking for it.

The episode was written and directed by series co-creator Trey Parker, and was rated TV-MA L in the United States for strong to extreme language. "Pinewood Derby" was seen by 2.78 million households in its original broadcast, according to Nielsen ratings, making it the second most-watched episode on Comedy Central the week it aired. The episode received mixed reviews upon its initial broadcast.

"Pinewood Derby" has been noted for spoofing a number of world leaders, such as Gordon Brown, Silvio Berlusconi, Vladimir Putin, Luiz Inácio Lula da Silva, Raila Odinga, Taro Aso, Han Seung-soo, Nicolas Sarkozy, Matti Vanhanen, Angela Merkel, Wen Jiabao and John Howard. The episode was originally scheduled to air on MTV Latin America in February 2010 but was pulled at the last minute, allegedly due to its perceived negative portrayal of Mexican President Felipe Calderón.

== Plot ==
Randy Marsh, determined to make sure his son Stan wins the annual statewide pinewood derby, slips an object into the back of the car to give it an advantage. Stan learns from a news report that the object is a superconducting magnet, stolen by Randy from the Large Hadron Collider. During the finals, Randy coaxes Stan to lie to the judges and say he used only the parts in the approved pinewood derby kit. Stan wins first place when his car reaches warp speed, shooting off the track and into space. It is later found by an alien bank robber named Baby Fark McGee-zax, who lands in South Park and holds the planet at gunpoint, demanding that Stan and Randy build him a new warp drive. Everyone believes that the two can do the job using only the approved kit.

Stan tries to persuade Randy to tell the truth about the stolen magnet, but Randy refuses in order to avoid embarrassment. As the pair works on the warp drive, an Intergalactic Police ship approaches Earth; McGee-zax cloaks his ship and drags Stan out of sight as a hostage, leaving the townspeople to divert the officers' questions. The officers say that McGee-zax stole a large sum of space cash, but no one admits to seeing him, and the officers leave. Randy then distracts McGee-zax so that Stan can stab him to death. The stolen space cash is found in his ship, but Randy divides it among the countries of the world to buy their silence instead of returning it. Four days later, the officers return to South Park, having learned that McGee-zax landed there; Randy tells them of his death, but everyone denies finding any space cash.

Randy tries to dissuade other countries from spending their shares in order to avoid alerting the Intergalactic Police, but his plan is ruined when Mexico and China undertake huge spending projects. Learning that Finland is about to reveal the secret, Randy gets the rest of the world to destroy that country in a nuclear attack. The officers visit South Park a third time to ask about the attack, but the residents again deny knowledge of anything unusual. Having finally had enough of the deception, Stan admits that he cheated in the pinewood derby and returns his trophy; however, no one else on Earth speaks up about the stolen space cash. McGee-zax emerges from the officers' ship, having faked his death, and reveals that he is actually an ambassador in charge of testing worlds that have developed warp drive capability to see if they are worthy of joining the intergalactic community and that Earth failed the test. He also reveals that the space cash has no value other than what it is given. As punishment for mankind's greed and deception, Earth and its moon are sealed within a force field and isolated from the rest of the universe.

== Production ==
"Pinewood Derby" was written and directed by series co-creator Trey Parker. The episode first aired on April 15, 2009, in the United States, and was rated TV-MA L in the United States. The theme of the episode was a warning about the dangers of greed, lying, cheating, and stealing.

== Cultural references ==
Among the world leaders who communicate with Randy in the episode are French president Nicolas Sarkozy, Chancellor of Germany Angela Merkel, Brazilian president Luiz Inácio Lula da Silva, Prime Minister of Italy Silvio Berlusconi, Chinese president Hu Jintao, Japanese prime minister Taro Aso, Mexican president Felipe Calderón, and Finnish prime minister Matti Vanhanen. The episode received some degree of criticism overseas for depicting the wrong leaders for its countries. The episode featured John Howard as Prime Minister of Australia, even though he had been replaced by Kevin Rudd almost eighteen months earlier; according to the Macquarie National News, the episode "has copped some flack on video sharing websites" over the error. The episode also features Vladimir Putin as President of Russia, even though he stepped down in May 2008. The episode also featured Prime Minister of the United Kingdom Gordon Brown.

== Reception ==
In its original American broadcast, "Pinewood Derby" was watched by 2.78 million overall households, according to the Nielsen ratings, making it the second most-watched Comedy Central production of the week, behind the Ron White stand-up special "Behavioral Problems", which was seen by 3.36 million households.

The episode received mixed to negative reviews. Josh Modell of The A.V. Club said the episode was "boring" and "unfunny", and was particularly disappointing following the episode "Fishsticks" the previous week. Modell said, "South Park episodes don't get much lazier or uninspired than this one. It was like half an idea stretched out forever and ever, and with very little payoff." Carlos Delgado of If Magazine said the episode plot was too silly and lacked laughs: "All in all, I was left feeling a little cheated. 'Pinewood Derby' wasn't funny, it was just weird." Ken Tucker of Entertainment Weekly said the episode was told with "the warp-speed storytelling style that is making this season one of South Park's best". Travis Fickett of IGN said he was happy to see an episode centered on Randy Marsh, who he said is an excellent character; Fickett said of "Pinewood Derby", "This isn't a great episode but its fast-paced lunacy in the South Park tradition and most of the genre tropes it riffs on are dead on."

== Mexican flag controversy ==
"Pinewood Derby" drew considerable media attention in Mexico when it originally aired due to its depiction of Mexican president Felipe Calderón. The episode was scheduled to air in Spanish on MTV Latin America on February 8, 2010, and was advertised extensively for one week prior to the broadcast date. However, a few hours before the scheduled time, the network decided not to air the episode and replaced it with the episode "The Ring", allegedly due to its depiction of Calderón irritating the international community and frivolously spending the space cash on water parks. This depiction was said to differ from the image Mexico's Ministry of the Interior sought to present of Calderón, whom they dubbed the "Employment president". MTV said the South Park creators did not get a special permit needed to broadcast an image of Mexico's flag, and MTV executives said they did not want to risk angering fans by altering the image. The explanation was met with skepticism by Mexican South Park fans, some of whom accused MTV of unfair censorship. MTV later announced it would broadcast the episode on April 4 after the network was granted permission from the Minister of the Interior to air it. When asked to comment on the episode getting pulled, Stone said, "That's so far away from us. We read that on the news, too, along with everyone else."

== Home media ==
"Pinewood Derby", along with the thirteen other episodes from South Park's thirteenth season, were released on a three-disc DVD set and two-disc Blu-ray set in the United States on March 16, 2010. The sets included brief audio commentaries by Parker and Stone for each episode, a collection of deleted scenes, and a special mini-feature Inside Xbox: A Behind-the-Scenes Tour of South Park Studios, which discussed the process behind animating the show with Inside Xbox host Major Nelson.
