= Shiba Inu (cryptocurrency) =

Decentralized cryptocurrency

- Shiba Inu logo

Denominations
- Code: SHIB

Development
- Original author: "Ryoshi"
- White paper: Shibu Inu Ecosystem
- Initial release: August 2020; 5 years ago
- Development status: Active

Ledger
- Supply limit: 1,000,000,000,000,000

Shiba Inu token (ticker: SHIB) is a decentralized cryptocurrency created in August 2020 by an anonymous person or group using the pseudonym "Ryoshi". It is inspired by the Shiba Inu (柴犬), a Japanese dog breed, which also serves as the mascot for Dogecoin, another cryptocurrency with meme origins. Some categorize Shiba Inu as a "meme coin." Concerns have been expressed about the concentration of the coin with a single "whale" wallet controlling billions of dollars' worth of the token, as frenzied buying by retail investors took place around November 2021, motivated by fear of missing out (FOMO). Shiba Inu was introduced with a branding that positioned it as a potential 'Dogecoin competitor'.

On 13 May 2021, Vitalik Buterin donated more than 50 trillion SHIB (worth over $1 billion at the time) to the India COVID-Crypto Relief Fund. Also in May 2021, Buterin donated SHIB worth $665 million to the Future of Life Institute, which focuses on regulating artificial intelligence to protect from existential risk from advanced artificial intelligence.

In October 2021, the market price of the cryptocurrency experienced a significant rise, reportedly increasing by 240% within a week. However, at the beginning of November, it faced a decline, reportedly losing approximately 55% of its value by the end of the month.

== See also ==
- Meme coin
- Dogecoin
