= Pump.fun =

Solana token creation platform

pump.fun
- Website type: Cryptocurrency exchange
- Available in: English
- Creators: Noah Tweedale, Alon Cohen, Dylan Kerler
- Industry: Cryptocurrency
- Website: https://pump.fun
- Commercial: Yes
- Registration: A Solana wallet is required to interact with the platform
- Launched: January 19, 2024; 2 years ago
- Current status: Active

pump.fun (commonly referred to as Pump) is a cryptocurrency launchpad for the Solana blockchain that enables users to create tokens and trade them immediately on the platform, as well as to launch them onto decentralized exchanges, a process known as "graduation". The platform was launched on January 19, 2024, by Noah Tweedale, Alon Cohen and Dylan Kerler.

As of January 2025, over 6 million meme coins had been launched on the platform according to Wired and it is one of the fastest-growing crypto applications ever according to some metrics by Ars Technica. Bloomberg reported in June 2025 that pump.fun is "one of the biggest drivers of the explosive growth in memecoins and the attendant burst in activity on the Solana blockchain in the past year." In Q1 2026, pump.fun's decentralized exchange volume exceeded $2 billion, signaling a continued surge in Solana meme coin activity.

The site has been described as the "ground zero" for launching meme coins, with users able to instantly create coins for free. While any type of token can be created, the majority of tokens are classified as meme coins due to their lack of functionality outside of trading. Created tokens face a high failure rate, with the vast majority of tokens failing to achieve the necessary traction and market capitalization to be listed on DeFi platforms such as Raydium.

Since its launch, pump has generated nearly $800 million in revenue. Its ICO in July 2025 raised $600 million in 12 minutes through a public sale as well as an additional $720 million in private sales, giving the company about $1.3 billion in cash. $465.5 million of this was cashed out by pump into USDC in November 2025 as its token, PUMP, fell more than 25%.

The platform has been compared with social media platforms such as 4chan, as all accounts are identified either with their Solana wallet address or a nickname, as well as token listings being laid out similarly to an imageboard's catalog feature.

The company is facing a sprawling class-action lawsuit with thousands of internal chats being reviewed by the court.

== History ==
The domain name was first registered on September 19, 2023, with the platform launching four months later on January 19, 2024. The website was started by an anonymous developer known as Alon, tweeting that he wanted to make it "the most fun place on the internet". It was later revealed from public documents associated with the website that the owners were a trio of English entrepreneurs named Noah Tweedale, Alon Cohen and Dylan Kerler, who say they started the site due to their frustrations with trading memecoins and the risks of getting rug pulled.

Pump.fun was estimated to have generated $60 million in transaction fees (a 1% cut of trades on the platform) in the first half of 2024, with over a million tokens having been created by July 2024.

The site launched a livestreaming feature in 2024 that allowed token developers to advertise their tokens to other users. Livestreams were used as a marketing tool for newly released tokens to stand out on the platform, as the constant influx of token creations on the platform can quickly make new coins become irrelevant. The feature became controversial not long after release, as a number of token creators began to partake in increasingly extreme actions to attract potential investors to their product. Some streamers claimed to be live from within U.S. prisons, ran live sex shows or played games of Russian roulette. One streamer threatened to waterboard another person.

In November 2024, "Gen Z Quant", a token made on the platform by a 13-year-old who publicized it through pump.fun's streaming service before dumping his holdings onto the market (roughly 5 percent of the total supply of the token) and abandoning the token after reaching a $1 million market cap, earning $50,000. This angered many of the platform's users, prompting the community to pump the token in revenge to an US$85 million market cap, as well as to dox the creator's name, home address and school. By this point, the app was reported to have collected over $250 million in revenue.

The livestreaming feature was indefinitely suspended in November 2024 following major community backlash and attention from financial news organizations with Pump stating that it would be removed "for an indefinite time period until the moderation infrastructure is ready to deal with the heightened levels of activity". It was relaunched in April 2025.

In December 2024, the site banned all users from the United Kingdom, following a warning from the Financial Conduct Authority about operating in the country without proper authorization.

In January 2025, a lawsuit against pump.fun was filed in the Southern District of New York by an investor who lost money buying a token named "PNUT". The lawsuit claims that pump.fun operated as an unregistered securities exchange and put investors at a high financial risk.

In June 2025, it was reported that pump.fun is exploring a token offerings which could raise as much as $1 billion making it one of the largest ever on Solana. At the time, Axios reported that "Pump has been the big success story of the last couple years, offering a quick and easy way for anyone to take a stab at meme coin millions." The offering went ahead on July 12, 2025 raising $1.3 billion for the company between $600 million in a public sale and $700 million in a private sale.

== Functionality ==
The site allows instant creation of memecoins by uploading an image along with picking a ticker and a name for less than $2 in fees. Pump earns a 1% "swap fee" on all tokens traded and 1.5 Solana tokens when a coin created on the site is listed, or "graduates", after hitting a market cap of $90,000.

According to Bloomberg, "new tokens on Pump.fun are created through a so-called fair launch method, where all tokens are minted at once without presales, often at a fraction of a cent." However, the app remains susceptible to "soft rug pulls [sic]". Its creators have stated that soft rugpulls are difficult to prevent through technical means; and that they instead give users access to information about a coin's legitimacy, including the percentage of a token owned by the largest holders, to assess risk.

== Notable tokens launched on Pump ==
Pump has functioned as the launchpad for many notable meme coins. Fartcoin, which briefly hit a $1 billion valuation as part of a sudden rise in meme coins due to the recent $Trump meme coin launch (which was released on the Solana blockchain, but was not launched through Pump), is a popular token created on the platform. Celebrities including Iggy Azalea, Caitlyn Jenner and Jason Derulo have released authorized meme coins on the platform.
