= Vitalik Buterin =

Russian-Canadian programmer (born 1994)

- Виталик Бутерин
- Buterin in 2015
- Born: 31 January 1994 (age 32); Kolomna, Russia
- Education: University of Waterloo
- Known for: Ethereum, Bitcoin Magazine
- Awards: Thiel Fellowship
- Scientific career
- Fields: Digital contracts, digital currencies, game theory
- Website: Personal website

Vitaly Dmitrievich Buterin (Russian: Виталий Дмитриевич Бутерин; born 31 January 1994), better known as Vitalik Buterin (Russian: Виталик Бутерин), is a Russian-Canadian computer programmer best known for co-founding Ethereum. Buterin became involved with cryptocurrency early in its inception, co-founding Bitcoin Magazine in 2011. In 2015, Buterin deployed the Ethereum blockchain with Gavin Wood, Charles Hoskinson, Anthony Di Iorio, and Joseph Lubin.

== Early life and education ==
Buterin was born in Kolomna, Russia, to a Russian family. His father, Dmitry, was a computer scientist. He and his parents lived in the area until he was the age of six, when his parents emigrated to Canada in search of better employment opportunities. While in grade three of elementary school in Canada, Buterin was placed into a class for gifted children and was drawn to mathematics, programming, and economics. Buterin then attended The Abelard School, a private high school in Toronto. Buterin learned about Bitcoin from his father at the age of 17. In 2012, Buterin won a bronze medal in the International Olympiad in Informatics in Italy.

After high school, Buterin attended the University of Waterloo. There, he took advanced courses and was a research assistant for cryptographer Ian Goldberg, who co-created Off-the-Record Messaging and was the former board of directors' chairman of the Tor Project.

In 2013, he visited developers in other countries who shared his enthusiasm for code. He returned to Toronto later that year and published a white paper proposing Ethereum. He dropped out of university in 2014 when he was awarded with a grant of US$100,000 (equivalent to $135,999 in 2025) from the Thiel Fellowship, a scholarship created by venture capitalist Peter Thiel and went to work on Ethereum full-time.

On 30 November 2018, Buterin received an honorary doctorate from the Faculty of Business and Economics of the University of Basel.

== Career ==
=== Bitcoin Magazine ===
In 2011, Buterin began writing for a publication called Bitcoin Weekly after meeting a person on a bitcoin forum with the aim of earning bitcoin. The owner offered five bitcoin (about $3.50 at the time) to anyone who would write an article for him. Buterin wrote for the site until it shut down soon thereafter due to insufficient revenue. In September 2011, Mihai Alisie reached out to Buterin about starting a new print publication called Bitcoin Magazine, a position which Buterin would accept as the first co-founder and contribute to as a leading writer.

Bitcoin Magazine in 2012 later began publishing a print edition and has been referred to as the first serious publication dedicated to cryptocurrencies. While working for Bitcoin Magazine, Buterin reached out to Jed McCaleb for a job at Ripple who accepted. However, their proposed employment fell apart after Ripple was unable to support a U.S. visa for Buterin.

In addition, he was from 2016 to 2024 a member of the editorial board of Ledger, a peer-reviewed scholarly journal that publishes full-length original research articles on the subjects of cryptocurrency and blockchain technology.

=== Ethereum ===
Buterin is the inventor of Ethereum, described as a "decentralised mining network and software development platform rolled into one" that facilitates the creation of new cryptocurrencies and programs that share a single blockchain (a cryptographic transaction ledger).

Buterin first described Ethereum in a white paper in November 2013. Buterin had argued that bitcoin needed a scripting language for application development. But when he failed to gain agreement, he proposed development of a new platform with a more general scripting language.

The Ethereum white paper was circulated, and interest grew in the new protocol in late 2013 and early 2014. Buterin announced Ethereum more publicly at the North American Bitcoin Conference in Miami on 26 January. Buterin delivered a 25-minute speech, describing the general-purpose global computer operating on a decentralized permissionless network, ending with potential uses for Ethereum that ranged from crop insurance to decentralized exchanges to DAOs.

About the Ethereum Project, Buterin said in 2020: "I am truly grateful to have the opportunity to work in such an interesting and interdisciplinary area of industry, where I have the chance to interact with cryptographers, mathematicians and economists prominent in their fields, to help build software and tools that already affect tens of thousands of people around the world, and to work on advanced problems in computer science, economics and philosophy every week." However, in a 2018 New Yorker article, his father suggested that Buterin was trying to avoid the focus on him as the philosopher king of the blockchain world, stating "He is trying to focus his time on research. He's not too excited that the community assigns so much importance to him. He wants the community to be more resilient."

Buterin has stated that he was driven to create decentralized money because his World of Warcraft character was nerfed, specifically by patch 3.1.0. He went on to say in his about.me bio:

I happily played World of Warcraft during 2007–2010, but one day Blizzard removed the damage component from my beloved warlock's Siphon Life spell. I cried myself to sleep, and on that day I realized what horrors centralized services can bring. I soon decided to quit.

=== Open-source software ===
Buterin has contributed as a developer to other open-source software projects. He also contributed to DarkWallet by Cody Wilson, Bitcoin Python libraries, and the cryptocurrency marketplace site Egora.

=== Ethereum Russia ===
As Buterin was recognizing the economic and political relevance of the Ethereum enterprise for his native Russia, he met with President Vladimir Putin on 2 June 2017, at the St. Petersburg International Economic Forum (SPIEF). Putin stated that he "supported the idea of establishing ties with possible Russian partners".

=== Work with Glen Weyl ===
Buterin came into contact with economist Glen Weyl after tweeting about Weyl's proposal for a new wealth tax. The two then wrote a manifesto Liberation Through Radical Decentralization, where they highlighted the common ground between Buterin's work on cryptocurrencies and Weyl's work on market-based solutions to social problems. Collaborating with Zoe Hitzig, a PhD student at Harvard, they published a paper in 2019 entitled A Flexible Design for Funding Public Goods. The paper sets out a method for optimal provision of public goods, using a version of quadratic voting. As of August 2022, quadratic funding had been used to allocate over $20 million to open-source software projects, primarily through Gitcoin Grants.

=== Artificial intelligence ===
In May 2021, Buterin donated $665 million to the Future of Life Institute, a nonprofit which, amongst other things, seeks to mitigate the existential risk from artificial intelligence. Buterin worries that AI could become the new dominant species on Earth, and may "end humanity for good".

== Awards and recognition ==
- Thiel Fellowship, 2014
- World Technology Award in the IT Software category, 2014
- Fortune 40 under 40 list, 2016
- Forbes 30 under 30 list, 2018
- Fortune the ledger 40 under 40 list, 2018
- University of Basel Honorary doctorate, 2018
- Time 100, 2021

== Philanthropy ==
- Donation of $763,970 of Ether to the Machine Intelligence Research Institute in 2017.
- Donation of $2.4 million of Ether to the SENS Research Foundation in 2018, for the research on rejuvenation biotechnologies and human life extension.
- Donation of $50,000 to the SENS Research Foundation in 2020. Together with Sam Bankman-Fried and Haseeb Qureshi, a total of $150,000 was donated the SENS Research Foundation to combat aging and aging-related diseases at the choice of users of Twitter through open voting.
- Buterin donated US$1.14 billion worth of SHIBA coins, which had previously been gifted to him, to India's Crypto Covid relief fund in 2021. This donation was 5% of the coin in circulation and caused a 50% crash in the price at the time.
- Donation of $336 million worth of Dogelon Mars ($ELON), which had previously been gifted to him, to the Methuselah Foundation, which focuses on extending human lifespan, on 12 May 2021. Buterin's donation of the memecoin caused a 70% drop in its value.
- Founding donation (amount undisclosed) to nonprofit biomedical research organization Arc Institute in 2021.
- Donation of $665 million to the Future of Life Institute in 2021.
- Donation of $760,000 of Ether to two messaging apps, SimpleX Chat and Session in 2025.

=== Philanthropic efforts against the 2022 Russian invasion of Ukraine ===
Buterin spoke out in support of Ukraine amid its invasion by Russia in 2022. On the first day of the invasion, Buterin tweeted that "Ethereum is neutral, but I am not", and that the attack was a crime against both the Ukrainian and the Russian peoples. A few days later, he responded to a tweet by RT's editor-in-chief Margarita Simonyan with "иди на хуй" 'go fuck yourself'. She had claimed that people who said they were ashamed to be Russians because of Moscow's actions against Ukraine were, in fact, not Russians at all ("Если вам сейчас стыдно, что вы русские, не волнуйтесь, вы - не русские.").

Buterin has donated crypto to projects supporting the country and endorsed projects helping Ukraine through "cryptophilanthropy". These include Ukraine DAO, in which his father Dmitry is one of the key-holders on its multi-signature crypto safe.

== Books ==
- Vitalik Buterin. Proof of Stake: The Making of Ethereum and the Philosophy of Blockchains. Seven Stories Press, 2022. С. 384. ISBN 978-1644212486.

== See also ==
- List of University of Waterloo people
- List of people in blockchain technology
- List of transhumanists
- List of philanthropists
