= Fishsticks (South Park) =

- South Park episode
- Episode no.: Season 13; Episode 5
- Directed by: Trey Parker
- Written by: Trey Parker, Bill Hader
- Production code: 1305
- Original air date: April 8, 2009

Guest appearance
- Jonathan Kimmel as Jimmy Kimmel (credited as "Francis Los Feliz")

Episode chronology
← Previous "Eat, Pray, Queef"	Next → "Pinewood Derby"
- South Park season 13

"Fishsticks" is the fifth episode of the thirteenth season of the American animated television series South Park. It serves as the 186th overall episode of the series, and was originally broadcast on Comedy Central in the United States on April 8, 2009. In the episode, Jimmy Valmer writes a joke that becomes a national sensation, and Eric Cartman tries to steal the credit while rapper Kanye West, believing himself to be a "genius", becomes frustrated due to his failure to understand the joke.

"Fishsticks" was written and directed by series co-creator Trey Parker, and was rated TV-MA L in the United States. The episode was conceived from a joke among Parker and fellow co-creator Matt Stone about a fish dressed as motorcycle daredevil Evel Knievel, which eventually turned into a joke about Kanye West not understanding a joke about why liking fishsticks made him a gay fish. The way Cartman tries to steal credit for the joke was inspired by real people Parker and Stone have worked with in the television business.

Parker provided the voice of West in the episode and during the song "Gay Fish", a parody of West's song "Heartless". "Fishsticks" received largely positive reviews, and generated a great deal of media attention when West wrote in a blog that the episode hurt his feelings, although he said it was funny and admitted that he needed to work on his ego problem. The episode also spoofed comedian Carlos Mencia, who praised the episode after it was broadcast.

According to Nielsen Media Research, "Fishsticks" was watched by more than 3.1 million households in its original broadcast, making it the most-watched Comedy Central production of the week. The episode received even further attention after West famously interrupted Taylor Swift during her acceptance speech at the September 2009 MTV Video Music Awards, after which Comedy Central reaired the episode four times back-to-back. "Fishsticks" was released on DVD and Blu-ray along with the rest of the thirteenth season on March 16, 2010.

== Plot ==
Jimmy Valmer works on writing jokes for his comedy routine while Eric Cartman sits on his couch, eating potato chips. Upon Cartman's request for more snacks, Jimmy remarks that there may be fishsticks in the freezer inspiring a new joke for the routine:

Jimmy: Do you like fishsticks?

Cartman: Yeah.

Jimmy: Do you like putting fishsticks in your mouth?

Cartman: Yeah.

Jimmy: What are you, a gay fish?

The joke, which plays on the similarity of the phrases "fishsticks" and "fish dicks" when spoken, becomes a hit throughout South Park. When Cartman begins taking half credit for the joke, Kyle Broflovski tells Jimmy he should stand up to Cartman, though Craig Tucker claims that Jimmy should be relieved that Cartman is only asking for half of the credit: as he believes reasoning with Cartman to be impossible. When Jimmy tells Cartman he feels he wrote most of the joke, Cartman fears Jimmy will try to take full credit and asks Kyle for advice on how to deal with Jimmy. Kyle instead says he believes Jimmy wrote the entire joke, and suggests that Cartman's ego is so big that he subconsciously remembers things incorrectly to make himself feel more important. This is supplemented by Cartman's flashbacks to the creation of the joke, which become increasingly inaccurate as the episode goes on, showing him to truly believe that he deserves credit.

Meanwhile, the joke becomes a national sensation. Comedian Carlos Mencia goes on Conan O'Brien's show claiming credit for the joke. The joke is played on rapper Kanye West, who does not understand it. West grows angry when others say he does not get it, and will not listen to anyone who tries to explain it to him, because he claims to be a genius and "the voice of a generation". West abducts Carlos Mencia, who admits he stole the joke to compensate for not being funny and claiming that his "dick don't work" in a parody of Viggo Mortensen's character Lalin in Carlito's Way, but West does not believe him and beats him to death with the help of his hired thugs. Cartman and Jimmy go on The Ellen DeGeneres Show and claim they invented the joke, prompting West to go after them.

Jimmy confronts Cartman, asking how he can live with himself for taking credit for a joke he did not write. They are interrupted by West, who threatens to kill them. By now, Cartman has not only convinced himself he wrote the whole joke without Jimmy's help, but believes he also saved his life from a black widow (in actuality, Jimmy's mother killed it), slew a dragon, defeated an army of "Jewbots", and has powers similar to the Human Torch. Cartman thinks he realizes what Kyle was trying to tell him, but he gets it completely backwards: Cartman believes that Jimmy's ego is the one that is twisted and Jimmy's ego trying to convince itself that he wrote the joke, while not accepting that Cartman wrote the whole thing. West has an epiphany about his own massive ego and is convinced that the joke was a statement about West's own identity. The episode ends with West donning a wetsuit and diving off the Santa Monica Pier into the ocean to embrace his new identity as a gay fish in the form of a music video, in which he happily swims around the sea, kissing and humping random fish.

In an alternate end scene, two members of the US Coast Guard retrieve West's waterlogged corpse from the ocean, having subsequently drowned.

== Production ==
"Gay Fish", an original song featured in the episode "Fishsticks"
"Gay Fish" served a parody of Kanye West's "Heartless", particularly in its use of Auto-Tune pitch audio processing.

"Fishsticks" was written and directed by series co-creator Trey Parker. The concept for "Fishsticks" began when Parker, fellow co-creator Matt Stone, and actor Bill Hader attended a writers' retreat in Seattle, Washington and they visited a body of water where they could watch salmon jump. They started joking about a salmon wearing an outfit like the motorcycle daredevil Evel Knievel, which eventually reminded them of the music video for rapper Kanye West's song "Touch the Sky", in which West himself dresses like Knievel. This led to them picturing a scene with West on a news program, angrily denying reports that he is a fish, shouting "No, I am not a salmon!" During a four-hour ride in a car, Stone and Parker discussed the joke further, and eventually thought of the "fishsticks" joke that featured prominently in the final episode. The duo said they found it hilarious and told variations of the joke back and forth to each other for the rest of the ride. Stone said, "The van driver we hired was just so bummed because we just kept talking about fishsticks, 'You're a gay fish', over and over. We thought it was so funny, and just the fact that he didn't get it."

Although the joke originally stemmed from Evel Knievel and not Kanye West, Parker and Stone said they realized West would probably be extremely humorless about the joke and not understand it, so they decided the episode should revolve mostly around him. After coming up with the idea, Parker and Stone waited a long time before they finally wrote the script because, Stone said, "It just seemed too dumb. Are we really going to do a whole episode about this?". Stone said the jokes about Carlos Mencia were "just a complete afterthought" that came about during the writing process. During one scene in "Fishsticks", Cartman steals credit from Jimmy for a joke he did not write. This was inspired by people Parker and Stone have worked with in the television business who were present for discussions the duo had, then later claimed credit for the idea even though they had nothing to do with it. Stone said, "They truly believe they did it. That's the really sinister part. It's not where they're trying to steal part of the glory. ... They actually fully believe that they came up with it".

Parker provided the voice of West, both in the episode and in "Gay Fish", a full-length song featured at the end of the episode about West's realization that he actually is a gay fish. Parker used a large amount of Auto-Tune pitch audio processing, which he had never used before. Parker said he eventually discovered he had to sing off-key on purpose in order to get the desired effect. Parker said, "You had to be a bad singer in order for that thing to actually sound the way it does". The day after "Fishsticks" was broadcast, the full two-and-a-half minute version of the Kanye West spoof, "Gay Fish", was made available for download on South Park Studios, the official South Park website. The site also featured T-shirts and hooded sweatshirts based on the episode. One featured Jimmy asking, "Do you like fishsticks?". The other features text from Kanye West's whiteboard in the episode: "Fishsticks + Me = Gayfish".

== Cultural references ==
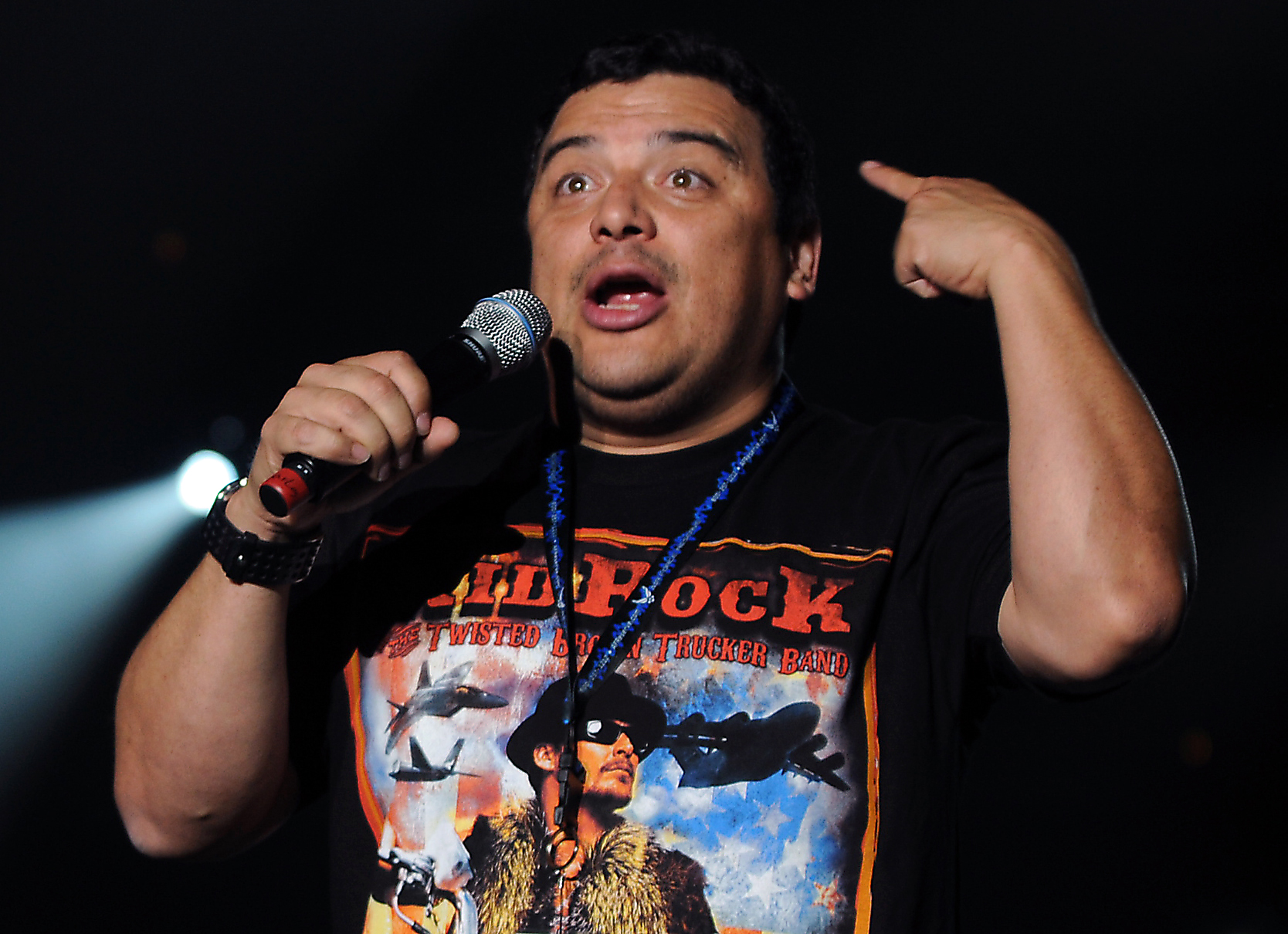
Carlos Mencia, stand-up comedian and former host of Mind of Mencia, is spoofed in "Fishsticks"

A Kanye West song in the episode about the fact that he is indeed a "gay fish" is a parody of the West song "Heartless", from his 2008 album 808s & Heartbreak and satirizes the rapper's usage of Auto-Tune. When West first confronts Cartman and Jimmy, Cartman mistakes him for Puff Daddy, another rapper and record producer.

Carlos Mencia, host of the former Comedy Central show Mind of Mencia, is portrayed in "Fishsticks" as knowingly stealing credit for a joke he did not write; this is a reference to accusations other comedians have made that Mencia plagiarizes jokes from other people. Mencia's death scene in the episode, as well as his claims that he uses a catheter to relieve himself, are a reference to Lalin, a character who uses a wheelchair in the 1993 crime film Carlito's Way.

Talk show hosts Jimmy Kimmel, David Letterman, Conan O'Brien, Jay Leno, and Ellen DeGeneres were featured in the episode. Kimmel is voiced by his real-life brother Jonathan Kimmel, who previously served as a writer and voice actor on South Park. During a fantasy sequence, Cartman says "flame on" and turns into a fiery, flying superhero; this is a reference to the Human Torch, a superhero and member of the Fantastic Four.

== Reception ==
In its original American broadcast, "Fishsticks" was watched by 3.1 million overall households, according to the Nielsen Media Research, making it the most-watched Comedy Central production of the week. It had over 1.2 million more household viewers than the second most-watched Comedy Central show that week, the April 8 episode of The Daily Show. In June 2009, "Fishsticks" was announced to be the most watched South Park episode on South Park Studios, the official South Park website, which has all but 5 episodes of South Park to date available for viewing.

Both Kanye West and Carlos Mencia responded within one day of the episode's original broadcast and said they enjoyed the parodies of themselves, although West said on his blog that his feelings were hurt. After the episode was broadcast, Mencia wrote on his Twitter feed, "They just made fun of me on South Park. I thought it was hysterical. Catch the rerun". West wrote on his blog, "South Park murdered me last night and it's pretty damn funny. It hurts my feelings but what can you expect from South Park!". West thanked the South Park writers in his blog entry and acknowledged he has a problem with his ego, but said he was trying to change. Parker and Stone said they were extremely surprised by West's reaction, and felt Mencia was treated far more harshly in the episode than West. Parker said, "It was like, dude, we just said you were a gay fish. What are you talking about? It was so dumb".

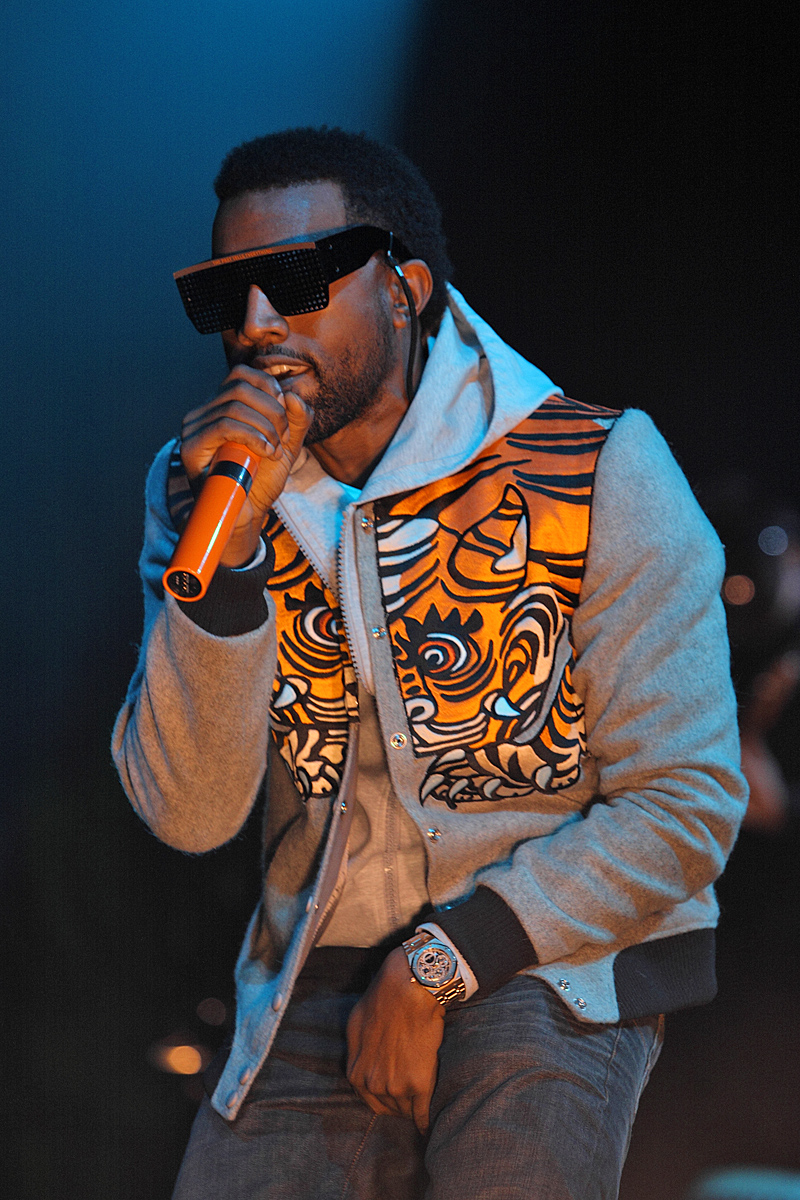
Kanye West, who was spoofed in "Fishsticks", wrote on his blog within one day of the episode that it was funny, although it hurt his feelings.

Simon Vozick-Levinson of Entertainment Weekly said the post was "a fascinating look at where Kanye's head is at these days", and complimented West for his "humility and honesty". Daniel Kreps of Rolling Stone said: "Many have tried, all have failed, but in the end it only took four animated children from Colorado to topple Kanye West's ego. ... One day, we'll all look back on this day and thank South Park for ushering in this historic moment in the life of Kanye". Kerrie Mitchell of Entertainment Weekly suggested West's modest response was actually a marketing stunt to help sell his upcoming personal fragrance and energy drink. Mitchell wrote, "Did he just get the last laugh on South Park? Conspiracy!". In response to the media coverage, West wrote another blog entry on April 10 claiming he had only seen part of the episode and found it funny, but he had been working on his arrogance problem for some time and that South Park did not lead to his "ego epiphany". The next day, he said in another blog entry that while visiting The Cheesecake Factory restaurant, the manager brought him a plate of fishsticks as a joke.

The episode received positive, if slightly-mixed reviews. Ramsey Isler of IGN declared it the best episode of the season, calling it a "beautiful Kanye West spoof that was so well-timed, so hilarious, and so spot-on" that it became a "phenomenon". Carlos Delgado of If-Magazine said the episode was "another South Park classic" which "takes full advantage of Cartman's monumental ego". Delgado, who gave the episode a B+ grade, described the West parody as "awesome" and the final scene with the "gay fish" West song as "spell-binding". TV Guide listed the episode at number five on the top ten television moments of the week.

Travis Fickett of IGN said the episode included some good laughs but "never kicks into high gear" and said the themes might have worked better as subplots than a full episode: "'Fishsticks' is one of those episodes that typically occur around now in the South Park season. It's not great, not bad - hovering somewhere around amusing towards forgettable." Sean O'Neal of The A.V. Club said he was disappointed by the episode and thought the message about celebrity self-delusion might have been better if it focused on only West or Mencia, rather than both. Although he liked the West song in the episode's final scene, O'Neal said "cramming (West and Mencia) together - even mixed in with Cartman's very funny fantasy sequences - felt too cobbled to me, and the time-limits imposed by cutting back and forth between it all made the respective digs start to feel a little too one-note".

== Legacy ==
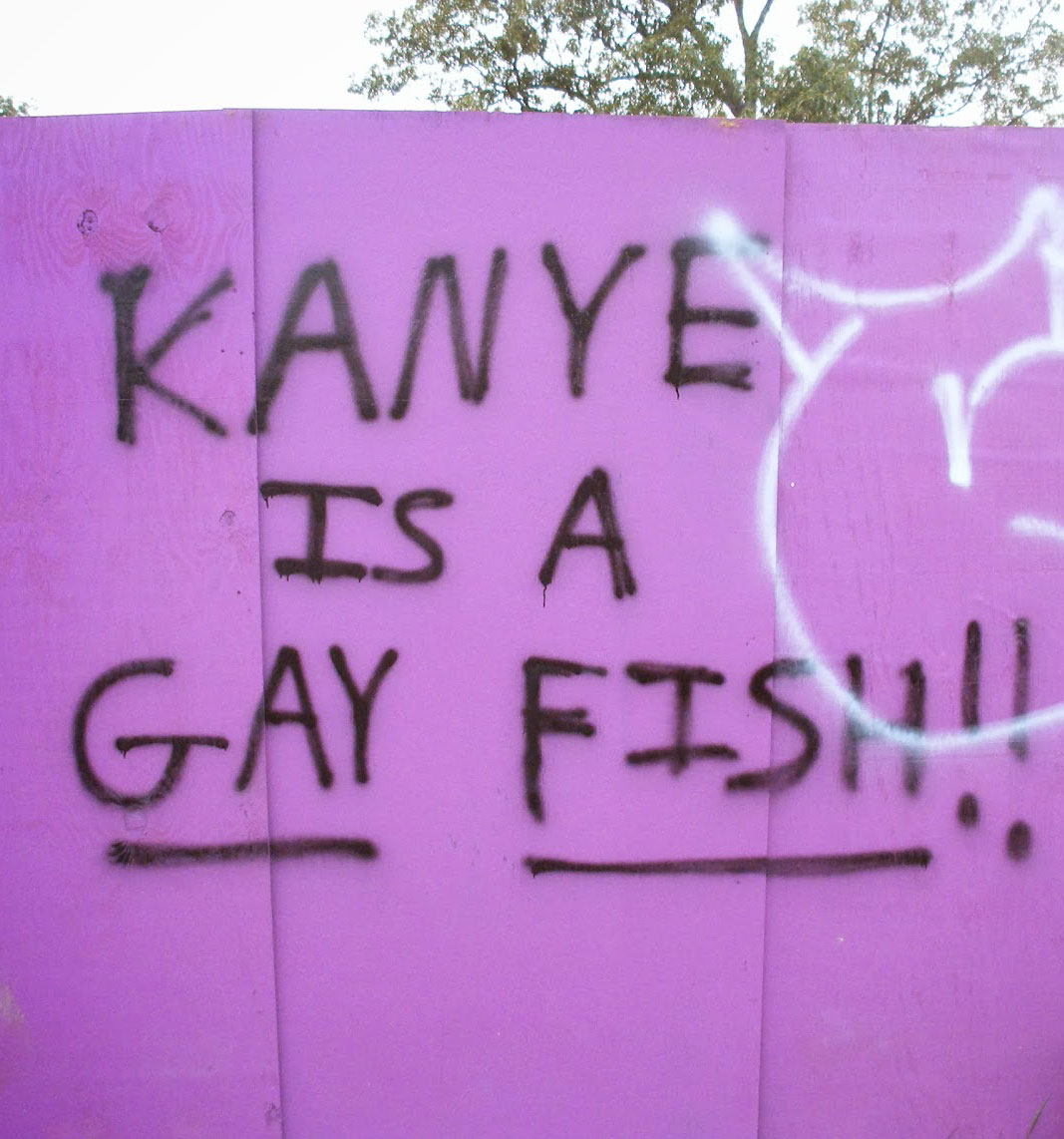
West's 2008 appearance at music festival Bonnaroo left many concertgoers angry; in the years afterward, attendees derided him as a "gay fish".

On September 13, 2009, during the 2009 MTV Video Music Awards, Kanye West interrupted an acceptance speech from Taylor Swift by walking onto stage, grabbing the microphone and praising her fellow nominee, Beyoncé. The incident received considerable press attention and drew further attention to "Fishsticks", which Comedy Central re-broadcast for two straight hours on September 15, 2009.

Following a controversial 2008 performance at music festival Bonnaroo, many concertgoers have since sprayed graffiti around the festival grounds, as well as making signs, deriding the rapper as a "gay fish". While the musical number "Gay Fish" was never officially released for streaming services, it did receive an official release as the B-side of a vinyl release of the song "San Diego" (from the season 16 episode "Butterballs") for Record Store Day 2013, under Comedy Central Records.

=== West's response ===
Kanye West references the episode in the song "Gorgeous" from his 2010 album My Beautiful Dark Twisted Fantasy where he says "choke a South Park writer with a fishstick". He similarly referenced the episode on his album Watch the Throne in the song "Made in America" when he says "South Park had them all laughin'/ Now all my niggas designing and we all swaggin'". It was also referenced in a leaked demo of his 2021 song "Life of the Party" that appeared on the deluxe version of West's 10th studio album Donda, in which he says "South Park had jokes about fish sticks/'Til this day the whole team can kiss this dick".

In an interview with Big Boy TV in 2019, West demonstrated not understanding the joke when he conflated "fish sticks" with a slur for homosexuality.

=== Coinye ===
A cryptocurrency called Coinye was created in January 2014. Under legal pressure, the developers had to change the logo from resembling West to resembling "a half-man-half-fish hybrid" instead.

== Home release ==
"Fishsticks", along with the thirteen other episodes from South Park's thirteenth season, were released on a three-disc DVD set and two-disc Blu-ray set in the United States on March 16, 2010. The sets included brief audio commentaries by Parker and Stone for each episode, a collection of deleted scenes, and a special mini-feature Inside Xbox: A Behind-the-Scenes Tour of South Park Studios, which discussed the process behind animating the show with Inside Xbox host Major Nelson.

== See also ==
- The Incredible Mr. Limpet
- Help! I'm a Fish
