= Meme coin =

Cryptocurrency originating from internet meme

A meme coin (also spelled memecoin) is a cryptocurrency that originated from an internet meme or has some other humorous characteristic.

It may be used in the broadest sense as a critique of the cryptocurrency market in its entirety—those based on particular memes such as Dogecoin, celebrities like Coinye, and pump-and-dump schemes such as BitConnect—or it may be used to make cryptocurrency more accessible.

Meme coins derive their price primarily from social media momentum and celebrity association. Their prices can skyrocket rapidly as new investors, drawn by viral attention or fear of missing out (FOMO), pour in funds. However, this growth is typically unsustainable, as the price depends heavily on a continuous influx of new buyers. When interest wanes or new investment slows, meme coins frequently experience sharp price collapses, as there is little fundamental value to support their market capitalization, much like how Ponzi schemes rely on new capital to pay returns to earlier investors.

The term is often used dismissively, comparing the value or performance of those cryptocurrencies to that of mainstream digital assets. Supporters, on the other hand, observe that some memecoins have acquired social currency and high market capitalizations.

== History ==
In late 2013, Dogecoin was released after being created as a joke on the Doge meme by software engineers. This sparked the creation of more meme coins. In October 2021, there were 124 meme coins circulating. Notable examples include Dogecoin and Shiba Inu.

In early 2021, Thailand's Securities and Exchange Commission banned meme coins as part of a crackdown on digital goods with "no clear objective or substance". In late 2021, advertisements promoting the meme coin Floki Inu in London led to investigations around promoting the meme coin, considered to be an unregulated financial product by the United Kingdom Advertising Standards Authority.

After a brief initial rise, the price of the $Trump meme coin declined. About 764,000 people who invested after the all time high (ATH) on 19 January 2025 lost money.

Meme coins increased in popularity in 2021 and 2022 when Elon Musk endorsed Dogecoin, one of the first meme coins. He posted several tweets about the coin, including saying that Tesla-branded merchandise could be purchased with Dogecoin. Musk was sued by investors who accused him of using Dogecoin as an unregistered security to operate a pyramid scheme.

Meme coins have seen a resurgence following Donald Trump's victory in the 2024 United States presidential election. One such example is Fartcoin, whose valuation briefly surpassed $2 billion. Trump himself launched the meme coin $Trump three days before his second inauguration.

In February 2025, the President of the Central African Republic, Faustin-Archange Touadéra, announced a national memecoin, $CAR, on his official X account. Soon after its launch, the project's X account was suspended amid questions about its legitimacy and because the announcement video had previously been flagged as a deepfake. Despite continued promotion from Touadéra via his verified X account, the value of $CAR dropped by 95% on February 11—just one day after trading began.

On September 9, 2026, $LAPTOP, a meme coin launched by Hunter Biden, the son of former US president Joe Biden, went from about $190 per token to less than $2 per token within minutes of its issuance indicating the risk of such investments.

== Rugpulls ==
In December 2024, Haliey Welch, who became viral online for the "hawk tuah" meme, issued $HAWK and it reached a peak of $490 million before plummeting to $25 million. She was accused of promoting a pump-and-dump as well as engaging in a rug pull scheme and insider trading.

During the memecoin frenzy of early 2025, hackers hijacked verified government X accounts, including those of the Cuban government, former Malaysian PM Mahathir Mohamad, and Bihar's Water Resource Department, to promote fraudulent memecoins like "CUBA" and "MALAYSIA" on platforms like Pump.fun. These tokens surged before crashing, with CUBA's volume dropping from $158.7M to $4.3M and MALAYSIA's rug pull draining $1.7M. The Catholic News Agency and German President's Frank-Walter Steinmeier's accounts were also compromised to push similar scams by repurposing them to impersonate various figures promoting tokens.

On 15 April 2025, hackers compromised UK Government Minister Lucy Powell's verified X account to promote a fraudulent "House of Commons" cryptocurrency ($HCC), using deleted posts with the House of Commons logo to tout it as a "community-driven digital currency."

== As an investment ==
In January 2025, three US asset managers set out to launch exchange-traded funds investing in meme coins linked to Trump and Musk.

== Criticism ==
Commentators have compared meme coins with the speculative frenzy and collapse of the non-fungible token (NFT) market in 2022. American investor David Einhorn stated that, "We have reached the 'Fartcoin' stage of the market cycle ... Other than trading and speculation, it serves no other obvious purpose and fulfills no need that is not served elsewhere." In February, more than 700 different copycat and spam coins were sent to Trump's digital wallet by people apparently seeking to falsely suggest they had his endorsement.

== List of major memecoins ==
Coin name	Ticker	Year launched	Named after	Blockchain	Peak market cap (US$)	Notes
Dogecoin	DOGE	2013	Doge	Dogecoin	~US$88 billion	Created as a satirical critique of the 2013 cryptocurrency boom and later boosted by celebrity promotion (notably Elon Musk). Musk-related posts were associated with surges in trading and price. In November 2024, Dogecoin spiked after Donald Trump announced a "Department of Government Efficiency" (DOGE).
Shiba Inu	SHIB	2020	Shiba Inu	Ethereum	~US$43 billion	Ethereum-based meme coin created in August 2020
Floki Inu	FLOKI	2021	A dog owned by Elon Musk	BNB Chain	US$2.3 billion	Dog-themed memecoin inspired by Musk's Shiba Inu dog "Floki" was launched in June 2021. In 2022, the Advertising Standards Authority banned the advertisement of token in the UK.
Baby Doge Coin	BABYDOGE	2021	A variant of Doge	BNB Chain	~US$1 billion	Dog-themed memecoin launched in 2021 as a variant of Dogecoin. It drew widespread attention after Elon Musk tweeted about it.
Bonk	BONK	2022	Bonk Meme	Solana	~US$3 billion	Solana dog-themed memecoin launched December 2022. Reported market cap around US$3 billion during late-2024 memecoin rally; described as created after the collapse of FTX to cheer up Solana traders.
Pepe	PEPE	2023	Pepe the Frog	Ethereum	~US$11.37 billion	Memecoin referencing Pepe the Frog; launched in April 2023.
dogwifhat	WIF	2023	Dog	Solana	~$4.84 billion	Launched during the memecoin boom in late 2023 as a dog-themed token, Dogwifhat drew widespread attention after Stratos, a firm based in Newport Beach, California, launched a liquid fund that held the token as an investment.
Peanut the Squirrel	PNUT	2024	Peanut	Solana	~US$1.2 billion	Solana-based token inspired by "Peanut" (an orphaned squirrel euthanised by New York State authorities), it was launched during the memecoin boom after the 2024 U.S. election.
Pudgy Penguins	PENGU	2024	Pudgy Penguins	Solana	~US$2.9 billion	Launched on Solana on 17 December 2024. In 2025, an ETF proposal linked to the Pengu token and Pudgy Penguins NFTs was filed.
Fartcoin	FARTCOIN	2024	Fart	Solana	US$2.3 billion	Started trading in late October 2024 and was reported at nearly a US$800 million market capitalisation by mid-December 2024. The Guardian reported a peak market capitalisation of more than US$2.3 billion.
Official Trump	TRUMP	2025	Donald Trump	Solana	~US$14.5 billion	Launched by Donald Trump on January 17, 2025; Reuters reported a peak market value over US$14.5 billion by January 19, 2025, followed by a large decline. The launch and subsequent losses were widely reported and scrutinized.
Melania Meme	MELANIA	2025	Melania Trump	Solana	~US$2.2 billion	Launched January 19, 2025 by Melania Trump. Reported market cap around US$2.2 billion shortly after launch. Bloomberg reported the coin was down about 90% from its peak by February 6, 2025.
$CAR	CAR	2025	Central African Republic	Solana	~US$600 million	Announced February 10, 2025 by the Central African Republic's president Faustin-Archange Touadera as an "experiment" in national development.
$LIBRA	LIBRA	2025	Viva La Libertad	Solana	~US$4.5 billion	Promoted by Argentine president Javier Milei beginning February 14, 2025; the launch drew controversy and legal scrutiny after a rapid collapse in value. Reuters cited researchers describing a peak valuation around US$4.5 billion before it crashed.

== See also ==
- Meme stock
- Rug-pull scheme
- Pump and dump scheme
- Pump.fun - Popular Solana token creation platform where many memecoins originate
