= Bitcoin Magazine =

Cryptocurrency publication

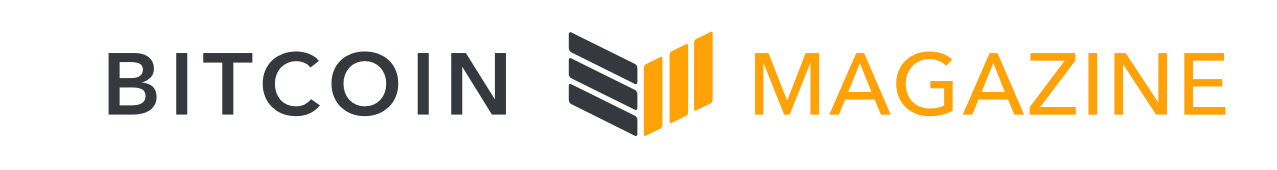
- Headquarters: Nashville, Tennessee, United States
- Area served: Worldwide
- Owner: BTC Media LLC
- Founders: Vitalik Buterin and Mihai Alisie
- CEO: David Bailey
- Industry: Digital currency
- Website: bitcoinmagazine.com
- Launched: May 2012

Bitcoin Magazine is one of the original news and print magazine publishers covering bitcoin and digital currencies. Bitcoin Magazine began publishing in 2012. It was co-founded by Vitalik Buterin, Mihai Alisie, Matthew N. Wright, Vladimir Marchenko, and Vicente S. It is currently owned and operated by BTC Inc in Nashville, Tennessee.

== History ==
Vitalik Buterin became interested in bitcoin in 2011, and co-founded the periodical Bitcoin Magazine with Mihai Alisie, who asked him to join. Alisie was living in Romania at the time, and Buterin was writing for a blog. Buterin's writing captured the attention of Alisie, and they subsequently decided to start the magazine. Buterin took the role of head writer as a side project while attending university.

In 2012, Bitcoin Magazine began publishing a print edition from its base in South Korea and has been referred to as the first serious publication dedicated to cryptocurrencies. Buterin noted he spent 10–20 hours per week writing for the publication.

In early 2015, Bitcoin Magazine was sold to its current owners, BTC Inc.

A physical copy of a 2014 edition of Bitcoin Magazine was displayed in the Smithsonian Museum as part of the Value of Money exhibit.

In September 2021, Bitcoin Magazine announced the launch of their Eastern European bureau based in Kyiv.

In December 2021, New England Patriots quarterback Mac Jones partnered with Bitcoin Magazine to gift both Bitcoin and Bitcoin Magazine subscriptions to his offensive line. During the 2024 US presidential election, Bailey, CEO of BTC, was at Mar-a-Lago, with Bitcoin Magazine streaming live on location.

== The Bitcoin Conference ==
Bitcoin Magazine has hosted annual bitcoin conferences since 2019. In June 2021, Bitcoin Magazine hosted Bitcoin 2021 at the Mana Wynwood in Miami, Florida. There were approximately 12,000 attendees. In a pre-recorded speech, El Salvador President Nayib Bukele announced his plans to adopt bitcoin as his nation's legal tender.

Bitcoin Asia in Hong Kong attracted around 5,500 people in 2024. In May 2024, David Bailey, as CEO of event owner BTC Inc, estimated around half the attendees were from mainland China.

On July 27, 2024, the Bitcoin 2024 conference was held in Nashville, Tennessee at the Music City Center. The conference drew an audience of 22,500 attendees, with Donald Trump as a featured speaker. Prior speakers included Jordan Peterson and Peter Thiel.

== See also ==
- List of bitcoin organizations
