= Hawk tuah =

Internet meme and onomatopoeia

- The moment Welch imitates the onomatopoeia in the original video
- Origin: June 2024 vox pop YouTube interview with a young American woman in the Broadway district of Nashville, Tennessee; onomatopoeic catchphrase
- Context: "What's one move in bed that makes a man go crazy every time?" "You gotta give 'em that 'hawk tuah' and spit on that thang"
- Meaning: The sound of spitting on a penis as a form of fellatio

External videos
- Interview with Haliey Welch, by Tim & Dee TV, published June 24, 2024.

“Hawk Tuah Girl Original Video”
Audio clip from the original interview.

Hawk tuah (/ˌhɔːk ˈtuːə/ HAWK TOO-ə) (Note: While the meme is usually pronounced /ˌhɔːk ˈtuːə/, the actual noise Welch made is better represented as a narrow phonetic transcription by [ˌhɔkʰ.ˈtʼʉ̂ʏ̯ɤː].) is an internet meme originating from a YouTube video posted in 2024. During a vox pop street interview in Nashville, Tennessee, Haliey Welch used the catchphrase "Hawk tuah", an onomatopoeia for spitting or expectoration on a penis as a form of oral sex, specifically fellatio. The clip gained widespread online attention and subsequently became a viral video.

== History ==
On June 11, 2024, a vox pop YouTube channel, Tim & Dee TV owned by Tim Dickerson and DeArius Marlow, released a video featuring an interview with Haliey Welch in the Broadway district of Nashville, Tennessee, United States. Welch and another woman approached Dickerson and Marlow and asked to be interviewed. The interview began with what Dickerson and Marlow considered tamer questions, such as, "What makes you wifey material?" Eventually, Dickerson and Marlow stated, Welch encouraged Marlow to "spice up the questions". Marlow responded by asking, "What's one move in bed that makes a man go crazy every time?" Welch's reply, in a strong Southern accent, was "You gotta give 'em that 'hawk tuah' and spit on that thang", referring to spitting on someone's penis as a form of fellatio for lubricatory purposes. The sound and physical movement by Welch imitated popular depictions of individuals in Old West saloons spitting into a spittoon.

== Popularity ==
The next day, Marlow uploaded the clip to TikTok and almost immediately other accounts across social media began reposting the video without the watermark. Dickerson and Marlow estimated that they filed at least fifty copyright claims in the days after they first published the clip. The original video had gone viral, receiving millions of views across TikTok, Instagram, and YouTube, spawning remixes and remakes of the original audio, and gaining Welch the nickname Hawk Tuah Girl. The video and phrase turned into a meme. Welch, who had been a minimum-wage worker at a factory, subsequently created an Instagram account and gained a sizable social media followership and media attention. She also founded a company under which she registered various trademarks, gained representation by an agent, and began selling merchandise themed on the phrase and making paid appearances. On August 15, 2024, she threw the ceremonial first pitch of a New York Mets game, and launched a podcast, Talk Tuah, under the Betr media company co-founded by Jake Paul. Dickerson and Marlow indicated they were happy for Welch but were upset for not receiving credit for Welch's fame.

== See also ==
- List of viral videos
- Brain rot
