= COVID-Crypto Relief Fund =

COVID-related charity in India

The COVID-Crypto Relief Fund (Crypto Relief) was announced on 24 April 2021 during the second wave of the COVID-19 pandemic in India. India Crypto Relief Fund was founded by Sandeep Nailwal.

== About the fund ==
All the donations are held in crypto wallets under a special entity in UAE - IN COVID SUPPORT FZE LLC. All wallet details - including the amounts collected under each cryptocurrency - are available to view publicly.

In August 2021, the fund signed a deal with UNICEF India to procure 160 million syringes. By mid-October 2021, the fund had "disbursed $36.28 million out of the $429.59 million collected till now in 10 different cryptocurrencies". Vitalik Buterin, Brett Lee and Balaji Srinivasan are among the contributors. Market volatility is also a challenge.
