= Solana (blockchain platform) =

Denominations
- Code: SOL

Development
- Original author(s): Anatoly Yakovenko, Raj Gokal
- White paper: Solana: A new architecture for a high performance blockchain
- Code repository: github.com/solana-labs/solana
- Development status: Active
- Developer(s): Solana Labs & Solana Foundation
- License: Apache 2.0

Ledger
- Block explorer: explorer.solana.com

Website
- Website: solana.com

Solana is a public blockchain platform that uses a proof-of-stake consensus mechanism and provides smart contract functionality. The platform's native cryptocurrency is SOL. Solana was founded in 2018 by Toly Yakovenko and Raj Gokal, and the network was launched in March 2020 by their San Francisco-based company, Solana Labs.

Designed to support decentralized applications and high-throughput transactions, Solana gained traction as a competitor to Ethereum, particularly during the rise of non-fungible tokens (NFTs) in 2021. The platform's architecture aims to provide faster transaction speeds and lower costs than other major blockchains. However, the high volume of transactions has also contributed to several notable network outages that have impacted its stability and reliability.

The history of Solana has been marked by rapid growth and volatility. After a successful funding round in June 2021, the price of SOL grew by nearly 12,000% that year, reaching a market capitalization of over $70 billion. The platform has since faced challenges, including a major wallet hack in August 2022, a price collapse following the bankruptcy of FTX, and legal scrutiny from the U.S. Securities and Exchange Commission, which in 2023 alleged that SOL qualifies as an unregistered security. Nevertheless, in January 2025 United States President Donald Trump's memecoin, $TRUMP, began using the Solana blockchain causing a brief surge to near all-time highs.

== Characteristics ==
According to the company's white paper, Solana runs on a proof of stake model. The New York Times and Financial Times described the coin as an alternative to Ethereum.

== History ==
Solana was first opened to the public in March 2020, with its first block being created on 16 March 2020. The Solana blockchain was designed to support smart contracts and decentralized apps in particular. Large numbers of simultaneous transactions have contributed to several outages of the Solana blockchain.

In June 2021, Solana Labs sold $314 million worth of its native cryptocurrency, SOL, to a group of funds led by Andreessen Horowitz and Polychain Capital.

The market capitalization of the Solana blockchain surpassed $63 billion in September 2021, and reached $74 billion in early November 2021, having risen by nearly 12,000% that year to a price of $259.96. The blockchain's popularity at this time was due in part to interest in NFTs.

On 1 July 2022, a class action lawsuit was filed against Solana Labs. The lawsuit accused Solana of selling unregistered securities tokens in the form of Solana from 24 March 2020, onward and that Solana deliberately misled investors concerning the total circulating supply of SOL tokens. According to the lawsuit, Toly Yakovenko, the founder of Solana Labs, lent a market maker more than 11.3 million tokens in April 2020 and failed to disclose this information to the public. The lawsuit claimed that Solana stated it would reduce the supply by this amount, but it only burned 3.3 million tokens.

On 3 August 2022, 9,231 Solana wallets were hacked and four Solana wallet addresses stole approximately $8 million from victims. The Solana Foundation said that the hack was caused by digital wallet software from Slope Finance.

In November 2022, the price of SOL token dropped by 40 percent in one day following the bankruptcy of FTX, due to sell off from Alameda Research. SOL tokens were Alameda's second-largest holding at the time and FTX held $982 million in SOL tokens. By the end of 2022, Solana had lost more than $50 billion in market capitalization since the beginning of the year.

From the start of 2023 until 15 March, coinciding with a rise in the cryptocurrency market, Solana's market capitalization had more than doubled to around $7 billion.

In June 2023, the SEC sued Coinbase, alleging that Solana and twelve other currencies offered by the platform failed the Howey Test and qualified as securities. The suit accused Coinbase of illegally evading requirements for disclosure by offering these tokens. The SEC had previously issued a Wells notice to Coinbase in March. Solana Foundation has denied that the token is a security. The price of SOL token dropped nearly 30% after this announcement from the SEC, This caused some exchanges to liquidate their holdings, including Robinhood which delisted SOL and other tokens named by the SEC.

In November 2024, Robinhood Crypto relisted SOL for U.S. customers, alongside several other cryptocurrencies.

In January 2025, the SOL token reached a new all-time high of $294, following the launch of US President Donald Trump's memecoin.

=== Outages ===
The Solana blockchain had experienced several notable outages in service.

On 14 September 2021, the Solana blockchain went offline after a surge of transactions caused the network to fork, and different validators had different views of the state of the network. The network was brought back online the next day on 15 September 2021. The outage lasted a total of about 17 hours.

The Solana blockchain again went offline on 1 May, with the outage lasting roughly seven hours due to it being taken offline by bots. The blockchain went offline again on 31 May 2022, due to a bug in how the blockchain processes offline transactions. This outage lasted about four and a half hours.

On 1 October 2022, the Solana network went down for 6 hours due to a consensus bug in the validator client allowing a misconfigured node to publish multiple valid but different blocks.

Solana's outages have frequently resulted in the value of the network's native SOL token falling.

== Trump cryptocurrency report ==
On November 25, 2025, U.S Representative Jamie Raskin released a report finding that following an investigation by Democrats on the U.S. House Judiciary Committee, it was determined that the cryptocurrency policies of Trump were in fact used to benefit Trump and his family, with Trump in fact adding billions of dollars to his net worth through cryptocurrency schemes which were entangled with foreign governments, corporate allies, and criminal actors, with Solana hosting much of Trump's cryptocurrency transactions. The report, titled Trump, Crypto, and a New Age of Corruption, also found that Trump dismantled anti-corruption and safeguards and pardoned people who were regarded as "corporate cronies" in order build his cryptocurrency empire.

== Application ==
In April 2023, Solana Mobile, a subsidiary of Solana Labs, began selling the Solana Saga, an Android smartphone with several Solana-based decentralized apps preinstalled.

In September 2023, Visa announced that along with payment processors Worldpay, Inc. and Nuvei, it had added support for the Solana blockchain to send payments to merchants using the stablecoin USD Coin (USDC), rather than fiat currency via bank wire.

In January 2025, Donald Trump launched his memecoin, $TRUMP, using the Solana blockchain, causing a surge in Solana usage.

== See also ==
- List of cryptocurrencies
- Decentralized finance
