= 2026 Binance hack =

Cryptocurrency theft

- Logo of Binance
- Date: 29 October 2026
- Type: Cryptocurrency exchange heist
- Outcome: ~US$6.3 billion (Note: Estimates vary between $6.3 and $6.4 billion.) in assets stolen with $2.7–$3 billion frozen (Note: Binance reported ~$3 billion frozen, Chainalysis ~$2.8 billion, and TRM Labs ~$2.7 billion.)
- Accused: TraderTraitor (North Korea)

On 29 October 2026, 6.3 billion US dollars worth of digital currency was stolen from Binance, a cryptocurrency exchange, allegedly by the North Korea-linked hacking group TraderTraitor. The exchange hack is the largest-ever cryptocurrency heist, surpassing the $1.5 billion Bybit hack in 2025, with the most affected blockchains being Ethereum and Bitcoin. On the day of the heist, approximately $3 billion of the stolen stablecoins were frozen. North Korea has since denied being behind the theft.

Binance, having initially halted all trades, stated it would cover all losses. The exchange began allowing withdrawal services for customers on 1 November, processing $4.65 billion worth of asset withdrawals on that day. According to Binance, by 3 November, 98% of the stolen tokens had been replenished. The United States Secret Service has said that they are working to recover the stolen assets.

== Hack ==
According to the blockchain intelligence company TRM Labs and the FBI, the hack was linked to North Korean hackers. Specifically, it has been attributed to TraderTraitor, who appear to be part of Lazarus Group. The hack is the largest-ever cryptocurrency heist, surpassing the $1.5 billion Bybit hack in 2025. According to the chief scientist of Elliptic, a blockchain analytics firm, the hack "is almost certainly the single largest-known theft of any kind".

Assets stolen
Blockchain	Value in US$ billions
Ethereum	3.8
Bitcoin	1.5
Tron	0.628
XRP	0.296
Solana	0.096
Arbitrum, Optimism, Base	0.039
Avalanche	0.028
Polygon	0.010

The hack began on 29 October 2026 between 8:05 p.m. UTC, on the XRP Ledger, and 8:20 p.m. UTC, on the Ethereum and Bitcoin blockchains. (Note: According to TRM Labs, the first transaction processed at 8:05 p.m. UTC, while Chainalysis said it occurred "around 8:20 p.m. UTC".) It took approximately 20 minutes, during which assets worth $6.36 billion were taken out of ten blockchains. The main Ethereum transaction was processed at 8:24 p.m. UTC with a combined 64 transfers. Further attacks occurred at 11:05 p.m. UTC on Avalanche and Polygon, followed by a final Ethereum transaction at 11:56 p.m. UTC. The hackers then moved 17,260 Ether to a new wallet address at 5:15 a.m. UTC the following day. According to Elliptic, in an attempt to circumvent the stolen funds being frozen, the hackers moved the assets to approximately 12,000 wallets.

Of the $6.3 billion stolen, the most affected blockchain was Ethereum, with $3.8 billion stolen, followed by 18,270 Bitcoin, valued at $1.5 billion. Other blockchains affected included TRON, XRP, and Solana; with $628 million, $296 million, and $96 million in assets stolen, respectively. One transaction was for more than $2.5 billion.

According to Binance's CEO Richard Teng, the hackers used a multi-signature protocol called EIP-7702 to execute the attack on Binance's hot wallet. The exchange later reported that due to the nature of the attack, that went beyond hijacking Binance's systems and involved granting network permissions directly on Ethereum, halting withdrawals failed to stop the attack.

While the exploit featured unique money laundering patterns, as of 30 October 2026, the hackers had yet to convert the stolen crypto into fiat currency. This process can take weeks to years and may require paying middlemen.

== Aftermath ==
Status of stolen funds as of 30 October
Category	Value in US$ billions
Stablecoins	3(Frozen by issuers/partners)
Bitcoin	1.5(Unable to be frozen)
Other assets	1.8(Remains with hackers)

Following the cyberattack, Binance halted all trades and suspended withdrawals. The exchange coordinated half of the hacked assets to be frozen by blockchain partners, with cryptocurrency companies, including Tether and Circle, freezing approximately $3 billion of the stolen stablecoins.

Tether initially froze cryptocurrency wallets at 9:01 p.m. UTC with Circle following suit three minutes later. At 10:06 p.m. UTC, Tether blocked Binance's hot wallet, with Circle doing the same at 11:53 p.m. UTC. Binance subsequently removed the hackers' permissions from its hot wallet at 12:10 a.m. UTC.

The day after the hack, the company announced that they would cover all losses resulting from the hack, saying that all user funds were "completely safe". Binance also announced that they were cooperating closely with law enforcement to determine the origin of the hackers. In response to the hack, Bitcoin fell by 5% to less than $80,000. A number of related businesses, including Robinhood and Coinbase also saw significant decreases in their stock value.

== Withdrawals ==
The day after the hack, the exchange stated that they had set aside $6 billion to cover all losses and Teng planned to resume services on Binance by 1 November, later expressing that they would "absorb the financial impact of [the] stolen funds" rather than their users. On 31 October, Binance announced that they had replenished 90% of the losses, with the remaining 10% representing tokens that were less liquid, maintaining the intention to resume withdraw services for customers on 1 November. The exchange began to allow customers to withdraw funds as planned, starting with Ethereum, USDT, and USDC, as well as some tokens on its own blockchain, followed by Dogecoin and Solana. Binance said that it used funds from its Secure Asset Fund, Futures Insurance Fund, Bitcoin reserve, and corporate treasury, in order to purchase tokens to cover the losses from the hack.

Within nine hours of withdrawals resuming at 6 a.m. UTC across all 15 blockchains, users withdrew $4.65 billion in assets and deposited $1.01 billion, resulting in a net total of $3.6 billion withdrawn from the exchange. According to the data platform DefiLlama, by the morning of 2 November, users had withdrawn a net total of $4.9 billion, equating to 3% of total assets. The exchange also reopened withdrawals for US dollars and dirhams that same morning. Binance stated that they had a remaining 5% of tokens to purchase in order to reimburse customers, and that withdrawals had begun to subside after the initial high volume. By 3 November, 98% of the stolen tokens had been replenished, according to the exchange.

== Investigation ==
Binance initially said that it believed the attack was carried out via a software engineer's compromised laptop, through which the hackers made unauthorized withdrawals. Other issues were soon identified. Binance posted a detailed post-mortem on November 3 on Twitter. According to the exchange, the hackers spent months planning the heist. A Binance engineer ("A") in the wallet team downloaded infected software to his laptop in June, which was quickly detected and removed by the company but provided the attackers with information about the engineer's role and colleagues. In September another engineer ("B") was contacted on an external job platform with an offer for a fake job interview, during which malicious software was placed on B's computer. This malware was not detected by the company and allowed the attackers to leverage the platform's internal artificial intelligence tool to get control over engineer A's computer. There they found a deployment permission token, which they were able to employ while controlling a third engineer's computer.

The United States Secret Service said that it was working to track, freeze, and recover the funds stolen from Binance. The FBI released Ethereum, Bitcoin, and Solana wallet addresses linked to the hack, and asked the public for any information.

A United Kingdom Financial Conduct Authority spokesperson confirmed that while Binance is not registered to offer crypto services in the UK, the Authority is aware of a recent incident and is currently investigating to understand its potential impact.

On 3 November, Kim Yo Jong, Department Director of the Central Committee of the WPK, and sister of North Korean Leader Kim Jong Un, issued a press statement through the Korean Central News Agency, denying that the hack had been carried out by North Korea. In the statement, Kim Yo Jong accused the United States of using the hack to attack the reputation of North Korea, and also denied North Korean involvement in the Bybit hack.

== See also ==
- 2016 Bitfinex hack
- Bankruptcy of FTX
