= Elliptic (company) =

Blockchain analytics company

- Industry: Blockchain analytics
- Founded: 2013; 13 years ago
- Founders: Adam Joyce; Tom Robinson; James Smith
- Headquarters: London
- Area served: Worldwide
- Key people: Simone Maini, CEO
- Products: Cryptoasset compliance and investigations software and data
- Website: elliptic.co

Elliptic is a British blockchain analytics firm headquartered in London, with offices in New York and Singapore. The company was co-founded by Adam Joyce, Tom Robinson and James Smith in 2013. It is the first company to develop cryptoasset anti-money laundering and sanctions compliance tools based on blockchain analytics. Its clients are primarily financial institutions and crypto businesses, although it also provides blockchain investigation tools and data to government agencies. Customers have included cryptocurrency exchanges, banks, and government agencies.

Investors in Elliptic include JPMorgan Chase, Wells Fargo, SoftBank Vision Fund and SBI Group.

== History ==
The company was co-founded by Adam Joyce, Tom Robinson and James Smith in 2013, with co-founder James Smith becoming CEO. By 2020, it was headquartered in London, with offices in New York and Singapore. In 2020, Wells Fargo invested $5 million in Elliptic, after an earlier funding round raised $23 million. One of its major investors in October 2021 was SoftBank, investing $60 million.

In 2020 Elliptic was named as a "Technology Pioneer" by the World Economic Forum, for its contributions in the field of fighting financial crime and anti-money laundering detection in crypto markets.

The company released an analysis of the 2021 Poly Network hack. in 2022, it released an analysis of the Harmony crypto heist. Elliptic also reported in February 2022 that at least $13.7 million had been donated to the Ukrainian war effort through anonymous bitcoin donations. In 2023, Elliptic was reported to have a "high level of confidence" that the Lazarus Group was behind the Atomic Wallet hacks. In February 2025, Elliptic concluded that North Korea was responsible for the Bybit crypto heist resulting in $1.4 billion stolen in Ethereum cryptocurrency, supporting ZachXBT. In 2024, along with MIT and IBM, Elliptic released an AI model trained to notice the "shape" of bitcoin money laundering on Bitcoin's blockchain. It also made its data set public.

In 2024, Elliptic reported that the industry of "pig butchering" crypto scams was largely run by one Cambodian online platform known as Huione Guarantee, which had ties to the Cambodian ruling family. Elliptic co-founder Tom Robinson was reported by Wired to recommend sanctions against Huione Guarantee. Elliptic reported that Huione Guarantee was "the largest illicit online marketplace to have ever operated," as at least $24 billion in sales had gone through." Robinson stated that he thought Google and Apple should "consider" when Huione Group was appropriate to be distributing apps on their services: shortly afterwards, by January 6, 2025, Google removed all Huione Group apps, while Apple took down only the Huione Group crypto exchange, leaving other services in the App store. After Elliptic's analysis of Xinbi Guarantee and Huione Guarantee, both were blocked by Telegram. In 2025, Robinson was Elliptic's chief scientist.

Elliptic also traced the Chinese criminal organization Xinbi Guarantee to having a registration in the United States in 2025. In June 2025, Elliptic reported that Nobitex, a crypto exchange in Iran, had been hacked by Gonjeshke Darande, with $90 million in crypto then destroyed.
