= Mushinsky =

Mushinsky is a surname. Notable people with the surname include:

- Alex Mashinsky (born 1965), American technology company founder
- Mary Mushinsky (born 1951), American politician

== See also ==
- Mushinski
