= Mushinski =

Mushinski is a surname. Notable people with the surname include:

- Marilyn Mushinski (born c. 1946), Canadian politician
- Parker Mushinski (born 1995), American baseball player

== See also ==
- Mushinsky
