= Celsius Network =

American cryptocurrency company

- Type: Private
- Industry: Finance, Cryptocurrency
- Founded: 2017; 9 years ago
- Founder: Alex Mashinsky; Daniel Leon; Nuke Goldstein
- Headquarters: Hoboken, New Jersey, U.S.
- Key people: Alex Mashinsky (chairman, former CEO); Nuke Goldstein (CTO); Rod Bolger (former CFO); Aslihan Denizkurdu (COO)
- Products: Mobile app, website
- Number of employees: ~450 (July 2022)
- Website: celsius.network

Celsius Network LLC was a cryptocurrency company. Headquartered in Hoboken, New Jersey, Celsius maintained offices in four countries and operated globally. Users could deposit a range of cryptocurrency digital assets, including Bitcoin and Ethereum, into a Celsius wallet to earn a percentage yield, and could take out loans by pledging their cryptocurrencies as security. As of May 2022, the company had lent out $8 billion to clients and had almost $12 billion in assets under management.

In June 2022, the company gained notoriety when it indefinitely paused all transfers and withdrawals due to "extreme market conditions", resulting in steep declines in the price of bitcoin and other cryptocurrencies. On July 13, 2022, Celsius filed for Chapter 11 bankruptcy. The company announced on January 31, 2024, that it had exited bankruptcy as part of a restructuring plan that involved the distribution of assets, including a newly created bitcoin mining company, to its creditors. Celsius wound down its operations as part of its emergence from bankruptcy. It shut down its mobile and web apps on February 29, 2024.

== Business model ==
The company facilitated lending and borrowing for its users. Depositors earned interest by depositing qualifying cryptocurrencies, with the rate of interest dependent upon the cryptocurrency deposited (e.g., up to 6.2% interest on bitcoin). The company paid the interest in cryptocurrencies, including in its own CEL token. Borrowers paid between zero and 8.95% on bitcoin-backed loans, depending on the loan-to-value ratio. Some of the money that Celsius used to fund the loans came from hedge funds that were looking for higher yields than banks pay.

Celsius generated revenue from token sales, lending, bitcoin mining, and discretionary trading of cryptocurrencies. Celsius claimed that up to 80% of its revenue was returned to its user community through interest payments on deposits made through its platform. The company did not charge any fees to its users.

On July 7, 2022, former investment manager Jason Stone sued Celsius, alleging that the company ran a Ponzi scheme. Arkham Intelligence estimated a loss of $350 million due to improper trading protocol, which was included in Stone's lawsuit filings against Celsius. On August 23, Celsius sued Stone, alleging that he lost or stole tens of millions of US dollars' worth of cryptocurrency. The independent examiner's report filed on January 31, 2023, as part of the bankruptcy filing, said that an insider at Celsius described aspects of the business model as "very ponzi like". In an internal memo, coin deployment specialist Dean Tappen stated "that his title at Celsius should be 'Ponzi Consultant.'"

== History ==
Celsius was founded in 2017 by Alex Mashinsky, Daniel Leon, and Nuke Goldstein.

=== Growth ===
In March 2018, Celsius raised $50 million in its initial coin offering (ICO) of the CEL digital currency. In April 2018, the CEL cryptocurrency began trading on cryptocurrency exchanges. In advance of the ICO, Celsius listed its currency as a security. In June 2018, Celsius launched its mobile app. In 2019, Celsius completed a $24 million equity round at $140 million valuation.

Celsius was a major buyer of its own token, buying CEL interest it owed to customers on the open market. Crypto analysis firm Arkham Intelligence estimated Celsius had spent $350 million on purchases since July 2019.

In August 2020, Celsius raised $20 million via an equity crowdfunding to support its operations. In the fall of 2020, the price of Celsius's currency climbed more than 230% in less than a month.

In October 2020, the company reported that its CEO, Alex Mashinsky, sold $500,000 worth of CEL tokens in one transaction. In December 2021, Mashinsky tweeted, "All @CelsiusNetwork founders have made purchases of #CEL and are not sellers of the token." Based on public data, Arkham Intelligence estimates that Mashinsky sold $44 million worth of CEL through exchanges.

In November 2020, Celsius said it had plans to open an office in Australia and to expand its office in Israel.

In December 2020, Celsius had $3.31 billion in assets under management. In January 2021, Celsius had more than $4.5 billion in assets.

In October 2021, Celsius raised $400 million in new equity from investors. The funding round was led by WestCap, the fund led by former Airbnb executive Laurence Tosi, and CDPQ, Canada's second largest pension fund. The funding round valued Celsius at $3 billion. At this time, Celsius's office in Israel employed 100 people.

In November 2021, Celsius acquired the Israeli cybersecurity company GK8 for $115 million.

=== Controversies and regulatory scrutiny ===
On April 16, 2021, Celsius confirmed that a security breach had occurred in its systems; a third-party server with customer data had been compromised, resulting in a portion of the company's customer list being exfiltrated and a phishing email being sent to Celsius customers.

In September 2021, authorities in a number of US states said that Celsius's interest-bearing cryptocurrency accounts constitute an unregistered securities offering. The attorney general of New Jersey ordered Celsius to stop issuing interest-bearing cryptocurrency products via a cease-and-desist order. Texas state regulators filed a notice seeking a hearing in February 2022 to determine whether to take similar action. Kentucky's securities regulator told Celsius to cease and desist from offering its interest-paying accounts in the state. Celsius CEO Alex Mashinsky said he was "very confident" that none of Celsius's products in the United States were securities. Celsius said it was working with US states in order to provide clarity about its business operations.

On October 18, 2021, Celsius received a request for more information from New York Attorney General, Letitia James. Earlier that month, Celsius had US$400 million in new equity funding from investors.

On November 26, 2021, Celsius announced that one of its senior employees was the focus of an Israeli police probe associated with prior employment activities; the employee was later suspended.

=== Decline ===
Celsius had been using the crypto custodian Prime Trust to store some customer assets since March 2020. This relationship ended in June 2021, when Prime Trust's risk team expressed concern about Celsius's strategy of "endlessly re-hypothecating assets … lending the same assets over and over and over again to juice yields". Prime Trust founder Scott Purcell suggested that re-hypothecating "would be destined for failure, as any sharp market movement in either direction would be catastrophic to such a ridiculously leveraged business model". Celsius sued Prime Trust in August 2022, accusing the custodian of retaining $17 million worth of assets after the relationship ended.

CNBC described Celsius as "one of the largest players in the crypto lending space" in the second quarter of 2022. The company had issued loans totaling more than $8 billion, and as of May, it had almost $12 billion in assets under management. In June 2022, Celsius said it had 1.7 million customers and that it offered yields as high as 17% per year.

On June 7, in a blog post entitled "Damn the Torpedoes, Full Speed Ahead", Celsius addressed rumors that the company had lost client funds by making poor investments and that it was facing a liquidity crisis. The company dismissed these rumors as the actions of "vocal actors … spreading misinformation". The blog post denied claims that Celsius sustained significant losses as a result of the collapse of Luna in the preceding month.

On June 10, during his weekly "Ask Mashinsky Anything" session on YouTube, the CEO denied that Celsius was having problems with clients' access to their funds, and he suggested that its critics were being paid by competitors. Mashinsky said on the live stream, "Celsius has billions in liquidity, right, and we provide immediate access to everybody". Around this time, Mashinsky was questioning skeptical commenters on Twitter, accusing them of spreading fear, uncertainty, and doubt about Celsius.

On June 13, the company paused all customer withdrawals "in order to stabilize liquidity and operations", citing "extreme market conditions". After this announcement, the prices of bitcoin and Ethereum decreased by 12% and 14%, respectively, from the previous day. Celsius's own CEL token, which had been trading for almost $7 a year prior, was down by one-third after the withdrawal pause announcement, falling to $0.21. The total market value of all cryptocurrencies fell to $983 billion, marking the first time since January 2021 that the cryptocurrency market was collectively worth less than $1 trillion. The news also caused a 10% decline in the share price of Celsius Holdings, an unrelated beverage company, on June 13, due to investor confusion between the two companies' names. The beverage company's shares increased by about 5% the following day.

Rod Bolger, who joined Celsius as CFO in January 2022, resigned on June 30. Celsius appointed Chris Ferraro, its head of financial planning, analysis, and investor relations, to succeed Bolger. Celsius Network laid off 150 employees, a quarter of its workforce, in early July.

=== Bankruptcy ===
Celsius filed for Chapter 11 bankruptcy on July 13, 2022, one month after pausing withdrawals. A declaration filed the following day reported a $1.2 billion deficit in the company’s balance sheet. Mashinsky said that the company had "made what, in hindsight, proved to be certain poor asset deployment decisions". According to the bankruptcy filing, the company had $167 million in cash on hand, which it said would provide "ample liquidity" to support its operations during its bankruptcy. Of Celsius's $5.5 billion in total liabilities at the time of its bankruptcy filing, the company owed $4.7 billion to its users, who were listed as unsecured creditors. Celsius's choice of Chapter 11 bankruptcy would prioritize repayments to secured creditors first, then unsecured creditors, then equity holders.

Mashinsky resigned as Celsius CEO on September 27, 2022. Chris Ferraro, the former CFO of Celsius, was appointed to replace him as interim CEO.

After Celsius filed for bankruptcy in July 2022, Molly White tweeted a list of excerpts from customer letters to the bankruptcy court judge. Among the stories were concerns about how Celsius had frozen their funds and statements about the company's negative impact on customers' lives. On its bankruptcy website, the company said that it intends to offer two options to customers, "… to recover either cash at a discount or remain 'long' crypto."

On September 28, 2022, the court ordered Celsius to publish customer lists with financial details to create transparency. Celsius had argued that the customer list had resale value and should therefore be kept secret. The CelsiusNetworth website was created based on court documents that are in the public record. According to CelsiusNetworth, the top three names lost $40.5 million, $38.2 million, and $26.4 million, respectively. Celsius owes users approximately $4.7 billion but lacks the funds to pay them.

On December 2, 2022, Celsius announced the sale of GK8, a digital asset custody platform, to the Michael Novogratz-founded company Galaxy Digital Holdings. According to a lawyer representing Celsius's creditors, the proceeds from the sale are expected to go to Celsius's legal fees and former customers.

On December 7, 2022, a U.S. bankruptcy judge ordered Celsius to return cryptocurrency worth $50 million to users of its custody accounts. In January 2023, the same judge ruled that about 600,000 customers had deposited cryptocurrency that, per the company's terms of use, belonged to Celsius, making the depositors into unsecured creditors.

On July 13, 2023, the Federal Trade Commission announced a settlement that would ban Celsius Network from handling consumers' assets. Its founders, Alex Mashinsky, Daniel Leon, and Nuke Goldstein, face federal charges. Celsius agreed to pay $4.7 billion, one of the largest settlement amounts in the FTC's history. Concurrently, the SEC announced charges of its own against Celsius and Mashinsky.

=== Restructuring ===
At a court hearing on February 15, 2023, Celsius stated that it had selected NovaWulf Digital Management to provide guidance for its path out of bankruptcy. The deal was subject to approval by a bankruptcy judge and by Celsius's creditors. Some Celsius creditors objected to the terms of the NovaWulf deal, such as that creditors would need to take a haircut on the assets they had deposited. The unsecured creditor committee (UCC), a recognized group of Celsius creditors, agreed that Celsius should proceed with the NovaWulf deal. According to a bankruptcy filing filed on April 22, 2023, two new groups will compete with NovaWulf to take over Celsius's assets: Fahrenheit, backed by Michael Arrington, former Algorand CEO Steven Kokinos, investment banker Ravi Kaza, and U.S. Data Mining Group and Proof Group; and Blockchain Recovery Investment Committee, backed by the Winklevoss twins' Gemini Trust, fund manager VanEck, Abra and Global X Digital. Arrington had tweeted that Coinbase was part of the Fahrenheit coalition, but later deleted that tweet.

On November 9, 2023, Celsius received U.S. bankruptcy court approval for a restructuring plan that will return cryptocurrency to customers and create a new Bitcoin mining firm owned by the Celsius creditors. The company announced on January 31, 2024, that it had emerged from bankruptcy protection and that it had begun distribution of over $3 billion worth of cryptocurrency and fiat currency to its creditors. Celsius also announced that its creditors will own Ionic Digital, a new bitcoin mining company that Celsius expects to trade publicly on a stock exchange. Ionic's mining operations will be managed by Hut 8 Corp., an existing mining company, under a four-year management agreement. Matt Prusak, Hut 8's chief commercial officer, is the CEO of Ionic Digital.

Celsius, as part of its emergence from bankruptcy, wound down its operations. Its mobile and web apps were shut down on February 29, 2024.

== Reaction to collapse ==
Celsius's bankruptcy filing ascribed its $1.2 billion deficit to a modern version of a bank run, in which depositors, anxious about the security of their funds, try to withdraw their funds in great numbers. One critic of Celsius told CBS News, "This was yet another bank run. You're not reinventing anything here. They were promoting their services as a better savings account but in the end you're just another unsecured lender."

The sudden end to customer withdrawals and subsequent bankruptcy led some commentators to highlight the lack of deposit insurance in the cryptocurrency sector. Celsius's terms of use permitted the company to halt trading for its users. Without deposit insurance, no entity is obligated to compensate Celsius's users or to prioritize them more highly than its investors should the company enter liquidation. Securities regulators in five U.S. states announced investigations into Celsius's withdrawal freeze within three days of the company's announcement. Federal entities such as the Federal Deposit Insurance Corporation (FDIC) had considered extending deposit insurance to stablecoin investors, but no FDIC protections for crypto investors existed at the time of Celsius's withdrawal freeze.

Celsius's collapse exemplified what one commentator called a "pervasive problem in the crypto industry, where financial services that claim to be decentralized … are actually centralized entities, with the power to control the flow of crypto assets." The bankruptcies of centralized cryptocurrency financial institutions like Celsius led some investors to lose trust in centralized storage and to move their funds onto hardware cryptocurrency wallets.

After the company collapsed, the United States Department of Justice charged Alex Mashinsky, its former CEO, with seven counts of fraud, conspiracy, and market manipulation; he originally pleaded not guilty to these charges. In December 2024, he pleaded guilty to two counts of fraud, and agreed to forfeit $48 million in gains associated with manipulating the price of the company's CEL token. In May 2025, he was sentenced to 12 years in prison.
