= Alex Mashinsky =

Israeli-American businessman (born 1965)

- Александр Машинский
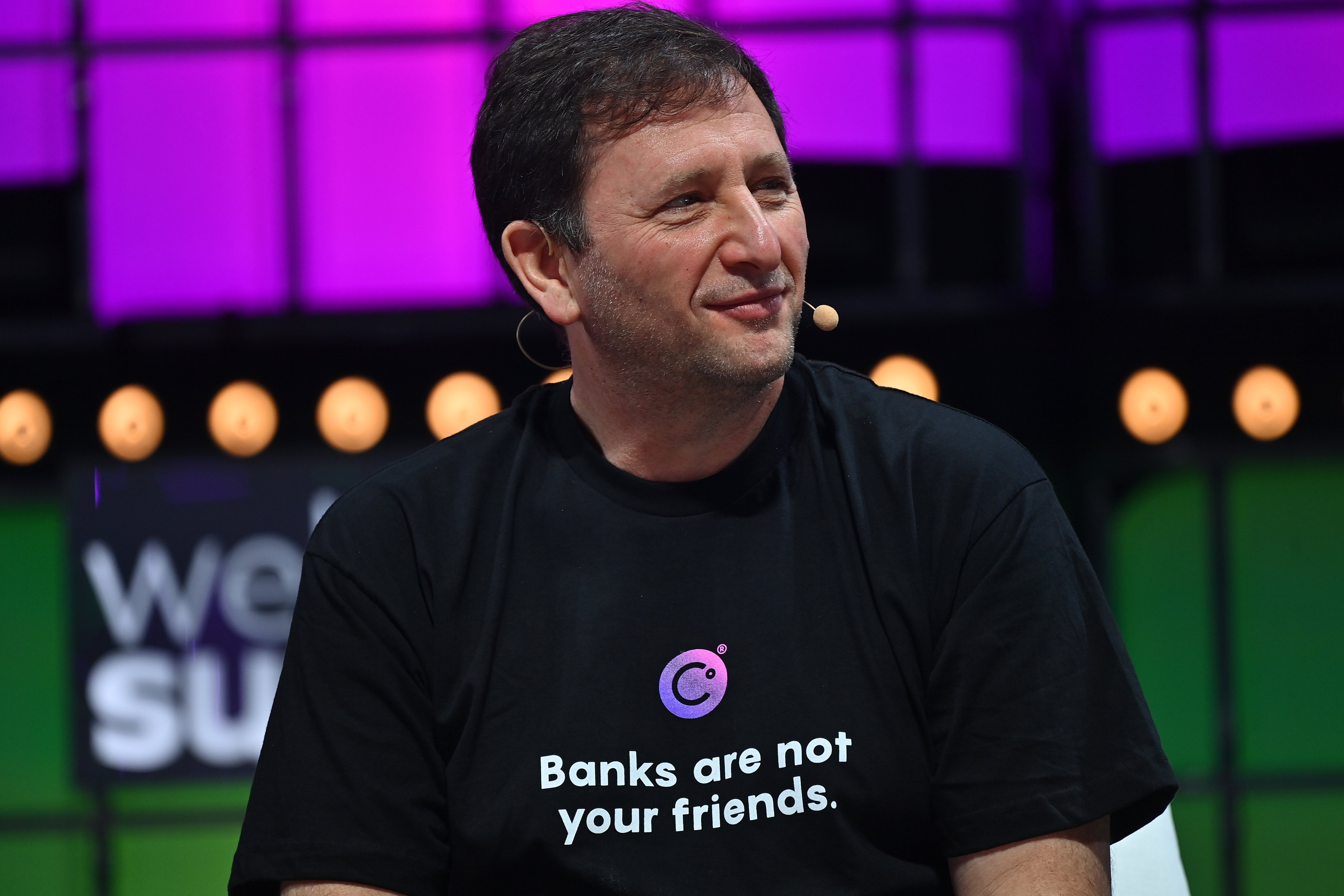
- Mashinsky in 2021
- Born: Alexander Mashinsky; October 1965 (age 61); Ukrainian SSR, Soviet Union
- Citizenship: Israel, United States
- Occupations: Entrepreneur, CEO
- Employer: Celsius Network
- Criminal charges: Commodities fraud; Securities fraud
- Criminal penalty: 12 years in federal prison
- Criminal status: Incarcerated at FCI, Fort Dix
- Spouse: Krissy Meehan
- Children: 6
- Website: www.mashinsky.com

Alexander Mashinsky (Russian: Александр Машинский; born October 1965) is an Israeli-American entrepreneur, business executive and fraudster. He is a cofounder and former CEO of Celsius Network, a bankrupt cryptocurrency lending platform.

In the early 1990s, Mashinsky founded VoiceSmart, one of the first firms to offer telecommunications switches to handle ordinary voice as well as Voice over IP call routing. Mashinsky founded GroundLink in 2004 as a service to book on-demand limousines and car services from a computer or smartphone. He also founded Q-Wireless, which later became part of Transit Wireless. From 2014 to 2015, Mashinsky was CEO of Novatel.

Mashinsky is the defendant in a civil lawsuit brought in January 2023 by the Attorney General of New York, who accuses him of securities fraud while CEO of Celsius. On July 13, 2023, the Securities and Exchange Commission charged Mashinsky and Celsius with violating federal security laws. On the same day, he was indicted and arrested by federal authorities in the Southern District of New York for alleged fraud and market manipulation. Mashinsky pleaded guilty to one count of commodities fraud and one count of securities fraud, and was sentenced to twelve years imprisonment.

== Early life ==
Alexander Mashinsky was born in 1965 in the Soviet Union to a Jewish family. His family obtained permission to leave the country in the 1970s and later moved to Israel. From an early age, he was a tinkerer, like his father, and would tap into and use public phone lines in Israel. As a teenager, he bought confiscated goods from Ben Gurion Airport at auction and resold them for a profit.

Mashinsky attended a few universities where he majored in electrical engineering but did not graduate. He served in the Israeli Army, where he trained as a pilot and served in the Golani Brigade, from 1984 to 1987. In 1988, he moved to the United States.

== Career ==
Mashinsky has worked in several industries, often focusing on popular technologies. The Wall Street Journal described him in 2022 as "a brash, confident serial entrepreneur with a constant stream of big ideas". On several occasions, Mashinsky left his companies after conflict or tension.

After relocating to New York City, Mashinsky ran a business trading contracts for delivery of chemicals such as urea, gold, and sodium cyanide. However, after the Tiananmen Square protests of 1989, the business slowed as exports of sodium cyanide from China fizzled. Mashinsky then worked at A+ Systems, a computer-based voicemail software company for phone carriers.

=== Telecommunications companies ===
Mashinsky was an early developer of voice over Internet Protocol (VOIP). In the early 1990s, he founded VoiceSmart, one of the first companies to offer computer-based VOIP phone service. By 1993, Mashinsky had realized the potential for a commodity market for international telephone capacity. So, in 1996, Mashinsky founded Arbinet, a marketplace for VoIP telephone service. The platform was one of the first to allow telecommunication companies to trade minutes. In November 1997, Arbinet began offering a similar service for data connectivity, allowing the more than 400 T1 lines connected to its New York hub to exchange their unused bandwidth.

In 2005, he sold his stake in Arbinet and used part of the profits to start GroundLink. The company allowed people to book limousine and car service from a smartphone or computer. Mashinsky was inspired to start the company after a car he reserved for himself and his wife did not pick them up, along with a business associate he was trying to impress, from the airport. In 2010, Mashinsky organized a joint venture between GroundLink and several limousine and car service companies. These companies with LimoRes Car & Limo Service, a company Mashinsky also founded, installed free Wi-Fi service funded solely by sales of advertising. He also partnered with Gogo Inflight Internet to offer complimentary in-flight WiFi passes to travelers who booked a GroundLink limousine while aboard a US flight.

Mashinsky's company Q-Wireless is one of four companies that constituted Transit Wireless, a joint venture to install wireless cellphone and free Wi-Fi internet service in the New York City Subway system. It took Mashinsky three years to convince the MTA to determine if there was a demand for cell phone service inside the subway system, and two more years for the authority to request a proposal. By 2010, his company had received a contract to install the service at 277 below-ground subway stations in New York City.

In April 2014, Mashinsky was named to the board of directors of Novatel, a provider of Wi-Fi hotspot products. He was appointed CEO in June of that year. In October 2015, Mashinsky left his position at Novatel after a year and a half as CEO of the company. In a 2018 deposition, Mashinsky said he was terminated from his post because he refused to move from New York to Novatel's San Diego headquarters.

RTX, a London-based financial technology firm in the telecom industry, hired Mashinsky as Global CEO in September 2016. After six months in the role, following a dispute with management, Mashinsky left the company, according to his 2018 deposition.

=== Celsius Network ===
In 2017, Mashinsky founded Celsius Network, a borrowing and lending platform for digital assets like Bitcoin, Ethereum and other cryptocurrencies. It encouraged its customers to "unbank" themselves and offered interest rates as high as 18.6 per cent on cryptocurrency deposits.

As CEO, he hosted "Ask Mashinsky Anything", a weekly YouTube livestream in which he answered questions about Celsius. He became known for wearing T-shirts reading "Banks are not your friends", for his critical comments about unsuccessful businesses (including his own), and for publicity stunts such as an attempt to vandalize a branch of Chase Bank.

In January 2022, Mashinsky took control of Celsius's trading strategy. Some insiders reported that he personally directed large individual cryptocurrency trades, overruling executives with significant financial experience.

Mashinsky withdrew $10 million from Celsius in May 2022. The withdrawals came as customers were withdrawing assets in large quantities while the company was nearing bankruptcy, according to a report in October 2022. A spokesperson for Mashinsky told the Financial Times that the funds were used for tax payments and estate planning. In total, Arkham Intelligence estimates that Mashinsky sold $44 million worth of CEL tokens through exchanges.

On July 13, 2022, one month after it paused customer withdrawals, Celsius filed for Chapter 11 bankruptcy. Mashinsky said that "the Company made what, in hindsight, proved to be certain poor asset deployment decisions."

Mashinsky resigned as Celsius CEO on September 27, 2022. Chris Ferraro, the former CFO of Celsius, was appointed to replace him as interim CEO. The Unsecured Creditors Committee, an organization of depositors, described the executive change as "a positive step" toward resolving the cases against Celsius.

== Legal issues ==
=== Civil lawsuits ===
On January 5, 2023, the Attorney General of New York filed a civil lawsuit against Mashinsky, accusing him of violating the state's Martin Act by committing securities fraud. Letitia James's office seeks a fine against Mashinsky, monetary damages, and a ban that would prevent him from leading a company or working in the securities industry in New York.

On January 31, 2023, Shoba Pillay, a court-appointed examiner and a former federal prosecutor, filed a 470-page report on Celsius (with an additional 200 pages of appendices) with the bankruptcy court. Pillay's report, as interpreted by Molly White, described "blatant fraud" by Mashinsky during his time as CEO. The report was particularly critical of the weekly "Ask Mashinsky Anything" livestreams, which were later edited and published as videos on demand.

The Pillay report also noted that Mashinsky did not personally read Celsius's terms of use, and made many public statements which contradicted the terms. Mashinsky repeatedly claimed that Celsius's CEL token was "registered" with the SEC, when it was not. The report described Mashinsky as personally intervening in key decisions such as Celsius's reward amounts, and stated that he personally benefited from selling CEL tokens, whose value Celsius pumped at his direction. Although Mashinsky told customers that the CEL token's value reflected the business's value, the Pillay report quoted internal conversations between employees who said that CEL should be valued at $0.

On July 13, 2023, Celsius Network agreed to a $4.7 billion settlement with the Federal Trade Commission (FTC). On the same day, Mashinsky was arrested and charged with committing securities, commodities, and wire fraud, and with committing securities manipulation and fraud charges.

=== Criminal conviction ===
On December 3, 2024, Mashinsky pleaded guilty to one count of commodities fraud and one count of securities fraud, and agreed to forfeit $48 million. On May 8, 2025, Mashinsky was sentenced to 12 years in prison.

== Personal life ==
Prior to his incarceration, Mashinsky lived in New York City with his wife, Krissy Mashinsky (Kristine Meehan), and six children. Krissy runs the online retailer usastrong.IO, which attracted controversy for selling shirts reading "Unbankrupt Yourself", a play on Celsius Network’s slogan "Unbank Yourself", after Celsius went bankrupt.
