= WazirX =

Indian cryptocurrency exchange

- Type: Private
- Industry: Financial services
- Founded: March 2018; 8 years ago
- Founders: Nischal Shetty, Siddharth Menon, Sameer Mhatre
- Headquarters: Mumbai, India
- Area served: India
- Key people: Nischal Shetty (Founder)
- Products: Cryptocurrency trading platform, peer-to-peer trading system, WRX utility token, NFT marketplace
- Services: Cryptocurrency exchange
- Parent: Zettai Pte. Ltd.
- Website: wazirx.com

WazirX is an Indian cryptocurrency exchange that allows users to buy, sell, and trade digital assets such as bitcoin and ether through web and mobile interfaces. The platform offers spot and futures trading and related services, and operates a native utility token, WRX.

== History ==
WazirX was founded on 8 March 2018 by Nischal Shetty, Siddharth Menon, and Sameer Mhatre as a cryptocurrency exchange focused on Indian users. The three co-founders had previously worked together on the social-media tool Crowdfire.

Within weeks of the launch, the Reserve Bank of India (RBI) issued a circular restricting regulated banks from providing services to cryptocurrency-related businesses, prompting several exchanges to exit the Indian market. In response, WazirX introduced a peer-to-peer (P2P) mechanism that allowed users to transfer Indian rupees directly between bank accounts while the platform matched orders and escrowed the crypto leg. Beginning on 1 November 2018, Shetty ran the #IndiaWantsCrypto social-media campaign calling for clearer regulation of digital assets in India. The RBI restriction remained in effect until 4 March 2020, when the Supreme Court of India set it aside, allowing banks to resume services to exchanges.

In November 2019, Binance announced an acquisition of WazirX, describing the deal as its first move into the Indian market; the financial terms were not disclosed.

In January 2020, Binance announced a sale of WazirX's native utility token, WRX, on its Launchpad platform, with the public sale conducted in a lottery format and balances recorded over 30 days from 4 January 2020. WRX was issued as a BEP2 asset on Binance Chain and described as the utility token underpinning the WazirX ecosystem, with uses including trading-fee discounts, trade mining, and margin fees.

In 2021, WazirX launched a non-fungible token (NFT) marketplace built on the BNB Smart Chain, on which creators could mint and sell digital works using the WRX token.

From 2020 to 2023, WazirX expanded its products and educational initiatives in India. It launched its WRX token in January 2020 and an NFT marketplace in April 2021. In 2022, it partnered with Gurukula Kangri University to provide a bilingual blockchain course and launched a Blockchain Park in Goa with Buidlers Tribe and Atal Incubation Centre. In 2023, WazirX partnered with TaxNodes on cryptocurrency tax services.

In 2022, Binance disputed having completed its 2019 acquisition of WazirX, stating it did not own equity in the platform or its operator Zanmai Labs. The dispute arose amid an Indian Enforcement Directorate investigation into WazirX-linked transactions tied to illegal betting apps, where funds were allegedly laundered into crypto via Binance. Binance said it only provided wallet infrastructure, while WazirX co-founder Nischal Shetty maintained the acquisition had been completed, leading to a public ownership conflict.

On 18 July 2024, WazirX reported a cyberattack on one of its multi-signature wallets, resulting in the theft of digital assets initially reported at more than US$230 million and later quantified at about US$234.9 million. The affected wallet was managed under a third-party custody arrangement with Liminal Custody, and the loss represented close to half of the exchange's reported reserves. Blockchain analysts attributed the attack to the North Korea–linked Lazarus Group. WazirX suspended deposits, withdrawals, and trading, filed police complaints, notified the Financial Intelligence Unit (India) and CERT-In, and launched a bounty program for recovery of the funds. The exchange reset user balances to their state as of 18 July and reversed trades made after the breach, and at one point proposed a "loss socialisation" arrangement spreading losses across users.

In August 2024, Zettai Pte. Ltd., the Singapore-incorporated entity associated with WazirX, applied to the High Court of Singapore for a moratorium under the Insolvency, Restructuring and Dissolution Act 2018 to pursue a court-supervised restructuring through a scheme of arrangement. On 13 October 2025, the High Court sanctioned the creditor-approved scheme with modifications, after the proposal was supported by about 95.7 percent of creditors by number and 94.6 percent by value. The plan provided for pro rata distribution of rebalanced assets representing roughly 85 percent of admitted claim value and the issuance of Recovery Tokens for potential future distributions. The sanctioned scheme was filed with Singapore's Accounting and Corporate Regulatory Authority on 15 October 2025.

Following court approval, WazirX restarted operations on 24 October 2025, enabling trading in phases over four days and offering zero trading fees across all markets for 30 days. Within ten business days of relaunch, the exchange distributed approximately 85 percent of users' rebalanced balances, and it migrated custody operations to BitGo. On 9 January 2026, WazirX announced that it had completed allocation of Recovery Tokens to all eligible users on a pro rata basis. The tokens are non-tradable and non-withdrawable, and entitle holders to future buybacks funded by recoveries and platform profits.

In November 2025, WazirX introduced a subscription model marketed as WazirX ZERO, under which users pay a fixed monthly fee of ₹99 (plus tax) in place of per-trade fees and can trade across more than 300 tokens. On 13 May 2026, WazirX launched rupee-settled perpetual futures contracts with maker fees of 0.02 percent and taker fees of 0.04 percent and no minimum-volume threshold, an initiative to bring together the platform’s security updates, transparency efforts and user safety education in one place.

== Operation ==
WazirX operates a cryptocurrency trading platform for Indian users offering spot and futures trading. Its products have included a peer-to-peer trading system used during the period of restricted banking access (2018–2020), the WRX utility token, and an NFT marketplace operated from 2021. WazirX is registered with the Financial Intelligence Unit—India.

WazirX’s Indian operations have been associated with Zanmai Labs Private Limited. Cryptocurrency trading in India operates within a developing regulatory framework rather than under a single comprehensive licensing regime. The Reserve Bank of India’s 2018 banking restriction on cryptocurrency-related services was overturned by the Supreme Court of India in March 2020. In 2022, India introduced a 30 percent tax on income from the transfer of virtual digital assets and a 1 percent tax deducted at source on transactions, after which reports indicated a decline in trading volumes on WazirX.

== Criticism and reception ==
WazirX is one of India's largest cryptocurrency exchanges by registered users. In mid-2021, its registered user base had grown rapidly, reporting 6.5 million users with June 2021 trading volume of about US$6.2 billion, by 2025 it has more than 16 million registered users.

After the July 2024 cyberattack, it was criticised over its risk management and over proposals such as loss socialisation, while regulators and observers renewed discussion of consumer protection in India's crypto market. Following the restart, some users and commentators criticised the rollout of new revenue products—including the WazirX ZERO subscription and futures trading—arguing the exchange should prioritise repaying the roughly 15 percent of user funds that remained locked in Recovery Tokens. The WRX token traded around US$0.02 in 2026, down roughly 99 percent from its April 2021 peak of about US$5.94.

== See also ==
- 2024 WazirX hack
- Binance
- Financial Intelligence Unit—India
