= 2025–2026 CoinDCX hacks =

Cryptocurrency thefts from an Indian exchange

- Date: 19 July 2025; 21 October 2026
- Location: India
- Type: Cryptocurrency theft
- Target: CoinDCX (operated by Neblio Technologies)
- Outcome: July 2025: about US$44 million stolen October 2026: 15.99 million USDT lost; losses absorbed by CoinDCX
- Suspects: Unidentified

The 2025–2026 CoinDCX hacks were two thefts of cryptocurrency from wallets controlled by CoinDCX, an Indian cryptocurrency exchange. On 19 July 2025 approximately US$44 million was stolen from an internal operational account used by the exchange to provide liquidity on a partner exchange.

On 21 October 2026 approximately 15.99 million USDT was transferred from a hot wallet and deposit addresses associated with CoinDCX on the Tron network. CoinDCX initially denied that its active wallets had been breached, saying the addresses had been compromised in 2025 and were no longer in use. CoinDCX confirmed the loss and attributed it to a failure in the automated process used to transfer deposits from deprecated addresses. The company said it had absorbed the loss.

Nine days after the second incident, on 30 October 2026, CoinDCX temporarily stopped traders from opening or enlarging futures positions after a security incident at Binance, one of its liquidity providers. The exchange said deposits, withdrawals and customer funds were not affected.

== Background ==
CoinDCX was founded in 2018 by Sumit Gupta and Neeraj Khandelwal, both alumni of IIT Bombay. It is operated by Neblio Technologies and became a unicorn in August 2021 after a US$90 million Series C round. In April 2022 it raised US$135 million at a post-money valuation of about US$2.15 billion, in a round that included Coinbase Ventures. At the time of the first breach the exchange said it had more than 16 million users. Its parent, the DCX Group, also includes BitOasis, an exchange operating in the United Arab Emirates and Bahrain, and the wallet Okto.

In October 2025 Coinbase made a further investment that valued CoinDCX at US$2.45 billion post-money. In August 2025 Gupta denied reports that Coinbase was in talks to acquire the exchange at a valuation below US$1 billion.

CoinDesk described CoinDCX in October 2026 as India's largest cryptocurrency exchange. In August 2024, days after the WazirX hack, CoinDCX set up its Crypto Investor Protection Fund with an initial ₹50 crore (about US$6 million) from its own reserves, and said it would add 2% of its brokerage income to the fund over time.

== July 2025 breach ==
=== Attack ===
On 19 July 2025 attackers gained access to an internal operational account that CoinDCX said was used only for liquidity provisioning on a partner exchange. Gupta described the incident as a server breach and said the account was isolated after the breach was detected. According to the police complaint later filed by the exchange's operator, the unauthorised transfers began at about 2:37 a.m. that day. CoinDCX said the stolen funds were moved across bridges between the Solana and Ethereum blockchains and consolidated into about 4,443 ETH (about US$15.7 million) and 155,830 SOL (about US$27.6 million).

The theft was first reported publicly by the blockchain investigator ZachXBT, who put the loss at about US$44.2 million. He said the attacker's address had been funded with 1 ETH through Tornado Cash and that part of the stolen funds was later bridged from Solana to Ethereum.

=== Company response ===
Co-founder Neeraj Khandelwal put the loss at US$44 million and said it would be borne by the company's treasury. The exchange also said it was working with cybersecurity firms, the Indian Computer Emergency Response Team (CERT-In) and partner exchanges. It stated that it would publish forensic findings after the investigation was completed.

On 21 July 2025 the company announced a recovery bounty of up to 25% of any assets recovered, worth up to US$11 million if the full amount were returned. The company said customer wallets remained uncompromised. In August 2025 Gupta announced the loss equalled about three to four months of revenue. He said it would be absorbed on the balance sheet in the 2025–26 financial year rather than drawn from the company's Crypto Investor Protection Fund.

=== Police investigation ===
Neblio Technologies filed a police complaint on 22 July 2025, and the Whitefield Cyber, Economic and Narcotics (CEN) police in Bengaluru registered a First Information Report. Police arrested a CoinDCX software engineer. According to police, the attackers had allegedly approached the employee under the pretext of offering part-time work and used the interaction to install malware on his company laptop, and had then used his credentials to reach the exchange's internal wallet systems. Police said their inquiries indicated that the employee had been unaware of the theft.

Gupta said initial findings pointed to a social engineering attack. Investigators were reported to be examining possible foreign involvement. Some media reports identified North Korean hackers as possible suspects, but no official attribution had been announced.

== October 2026 transfers ==
=== Transfers ===
On 21 October 2026 a hot wallet and several deposit addresses linked to CoinDCX sent about 15.99 million USDT and 5,783.81 TRX to a single newly created Tron address. The transfers were reported on X early the following day by Darcy, a blockchain security researcher and co-founder of the asset-recovery firm FlashRescue. The largest single transfer was 15,819,002 USDT. The receiving address then split the funds, which were sent on to deposit addresses at Binance, OKX and Gate. According to Darcy, some funds also reached addresses linked to the Cambodia-based Huione Group.

An analysis by the blockchain-data firm Bitquery found that the funds came from 40 Tron addresses. It found that approximately US$9.63 million had reached deposit addresses associated with OKX, Binance and Gate within 18 hours of the main transfer. The analysis also found that Tether froze approximately US$2.21 million held across nine wallets on 22 October.

=== Initial response ===
Gupta replied on X that the report was incorrect and that CoinDCX wallets had not been breached. He said the attackers appeared to be reusing addresses that had been compromised in July 2025, and called the report a false alarm. A company spokesperson told CoinDesk that the addresses had been created in January 2025, compromised in July 2025 and subsequently retired. The spokesperson said the exchange's current addresses had not been affected.

ZachXBT disputed this account. He said a deposit address labelled TQKJQ had been used by a liquidity provider for ten months after the July 2025 incident, and had swept deposits into CoinDCX's current hot wallet as recently as April and May 2026. Gupta replied that the company was aware of this and was investigating, adding that no user funds would be lost. ZachXBT later advised users to withdraw their funds from the exchange and accused its co-founders of having either lied or been negligent. He also said he had helped freeze some of the stolen funds on the exchange's behalf.

=== Confirmation of loss ===
Later on 22 October, CoinDCX said some users had continued to deposit funds to deprecated addresses despite previous notices. The company said the automated process for transferring deposits from those addresses had failed for a period. It stated that the issue had been identified that morning, affected users had been credited, and the company had absorbed the resulting operational losses. It did not disclose the total amount at that time.

In a blog post published on 25 October, CoinDCX said its old wallet infrastructure contained previously unidentified vulnerabilities. It stated that its automated sweeping service had failed for a period, so that deposits accumulated in a deprecated address, and that this had led to a loss of 15.99 million USDT absorbed by the company. CoinDCX also said customer funds remained in segregated cold wallets and that trading, deposits and withdrawals had continued normally. MediaNama estimated the loss at about ₹152 crore.

The company acknowledged that it could have communicated the incident earlier.

The company's disclosure appeared on its blog under the title "On-chain wallet activity update – 21 Oct 2026". CoinDCX had lost nearly US$16 million after attackers exploited weaknesses in wallets retired after the 2025 breach, days after Gupta had dismissed the reports as a false alarm. It credited Darcy and ZachXBT with flagging the transactions. The South Korean outlet Bloomingbit described the funds as drained from an older wallet into which some user deposits had kept flowing after it was taken out of service.

=== Differences between the 2025 and 2026 disclosures ===
CoinDCX's account of the infrastructure affected in July 2025 differed from its subsequent explanation of the October 2026 transfers. In a recovery-bounty announcement published on 25 July 2025, the exchange stated that its wallet systems had never been compromised and described the earlier attack as affecting an operational account.

Following the October 2026 transfers, CoinDCX stated that the affected Tron addresses had been compromised during the July 2025 incident and subsequently retired. Its initial response maintained that the addresses had not been used by the exchange since that time. The company later acknowledged that deposits had continued to arrive at the addresses and that its automated process for transferring those deposits had failed. Inc42 reported the sequence as an initial denial followed by disclosure of operational losses.

In an update published on 25 October, CoinDCX said an investigation had identified previously unknown vulnerabilities in its deprecated wallet infrastructure. It confirmed that the failure of its sweeping service had allowed deposits to accumulate and resulted in a loss of 15.99 million USDT. The company maintained that its active wallets and trading systems had remained unaffected.

Blockchain analytics company Bitquery separately disputed several elements of CoinDCX's initial account. It reported that 26 of the 40 affected wallets had recorded activity before 2025 and that none had first been used in January 2025, contrary to the company's earlier description of their creation dates. Bitquery also identified continued deposit-processing activity involving several affected addresses during September and October 2026.

=== Deposit-processing history and unswept deposits ===
According to Bitquery's analysis, more than US$100 million had been deposited into the principal Tron address over approximately 14 months. Around US$85 million of those deposits had previously been transferred out through CoinDCX-associated deposit-processing infrastructure, generally within approximately one minute of receipt. These amounts represented historical deposits and transfers rather than additional stolen funds.

Bitquery identified 88 deposits totalling approximately 15.82 million USDT that arrived at the address between 29 January and 30 March 2026. Unlike earlier deposits, these funds were not transferred out and remained in the address until the October withdrawals.

The investigation found that other deposit addresses continued to be processed during the same period. On 11 March 2026, for example, Bitquery reported that CoinDCX's automated system transferred deposits from 518 addresses within six minutes, while leaving the principal address, then containing more than US$9 million, untouched. Later deposits into the principal address were reportedly transferred out normally, although the accumulated balance remained.

CoinDCX subsequently acknowledged that its automated sweeping process had failed during an unspecified period. The exchange stated that deposits sent to deprecated addresses had been credited to affected customers and that the resulting operational losses were absorbed by the company. Inc42 reported that CoinDCX had not disclosed the precise duration of the failure in its initial acknowledgement.

=== TRX fee funding and wallet interactions ===
Bitquery's investigation also examined the infrastructure used to transfer USDT from individual Tron deposit addresses into CoinDCX's collecting wallets. The process required transaction resources on the Tron network. According to Bitquery, a fee-funding wallet identified as TFLxNHunhEizmeEdiMyA3r2XGLSKaEznGd routinely transferred approximately 15 TRX to deposit addresses before their USDT balances were moved to a collecting wallet.

Bitquery reported 276 such fee top-ups since August 2026, each followed by a deposit transfer. It also identified approximately 14,519 TRX transferred from treasury-linked addresses to the fee-funding wallet between April and August 2026. The firm interpreted these transactions as evidence of continuing operational connections between CoinDCX-associated infrastructure and addresses the exchange had described as retired.

The findings were relevant to co-founder Sumit Gupta's initial assertion that none of CoinDCX's current central or customer wallet addresses had transferred funds to the affected older addresses. Moneycontrol reported Gupta's denial and the subsequent dispute raised by blockchain investigators.

The treasury-linked transfers identified by Bitquery were made to the fee-funding wallet and do not necessarily establish direct transfers from treasury addresses to every affected deposit address. The analysis nevertheless documented continuing deposit-sweeping activity involving wallets that CoinDCX had initially described as inactive.

=== Liquidity-provider deposits and address deprecation ===
Blockchain investigator ZachXBT identified the principal affected Tron address as one used by a liquidity provider. CoinDesk reported his finding that the address had continued receiving deposits and transferring funds into CoinDCX's current hot wallet during April and May 2026, several months after the July 2025 breach.

A cryptocurrency exchange may assign a separate Tron deposit address to a customer account while retaining control of the signing credentials required to transfer the deposited funds. Bitquery reported that the principal address received deposits from one major depositor and was connected to CoinDCX's automated deposit-processing infrastructure.

CoinDCX stated that customers had previously been instructed to stop using the deprecated addresses and to obtain updated addresses from its platform. The exchange acknowledged that some depositors continued sending cryptocurrency to the old addresses despite those notifications.

The published statements did not specify when the depositor associated with the principal address received notice, whether a replacement address was assigned or whether the depositor acknowledged the change. The timing of the notification remained relevant to the continued receipt of deposits after the addresses were said to have been compromised.

=== Signing credentials and possible shared-key exposure ===
The October transfers also raised questions about access to the signing credentials associated with the affected wallets. Automated deposit-sweeping systems require the ability to authorise transactions from deposit addresses, either through direct access to private keys or through a separate signing or custody service.

Bitquery reported that the October attacker was able to transfer funds from addresses that had remained operational during 2026 as well as two older wallets whose previous routine activity dated to 2023. One was described as a hot wallet that had become inactive in October 2023, while another had previously received funds from a CoinDCX-associated cold wallet. Bitquery interpreted this pattern as potentially indicating access to a wider collection of wallet signing credentials.

The findings did not establish how the credentials had been obtained or whether they had been compromised simultaneously. Operating multiple blockchain wallets does not necessarily require all private keys to be stored together on a single server, and the publicly available analysis did not establish CoinDCX's internal key-management architecture.

CoinDCX attributed the exposure of the affected infrastructure to the July 2025 security breach. Its 25 October 2026 update also acknowledged previously unidentified vulnerabilities in the deprecated infrastructure. Neither statement established when the credentials used in the October transfers were first obtained by an unauthorised actor.

=== Futures restrictions after the Binance hack ===
On 30 October 2026 CoinDCX put its futures market in reduce-only mode as a precaution, citing developments affecting a global liquidity provider; a spokesperson told CoinDesk the provider was Binance. Traders could not open or enlarge positions but could still adjust margin, and the exchange said deposits, withdrawals and customer funds were unaffected.

CoinDesk reported that CoinDCX draws a significant share of its futures liquidity from global venues including Binance, whose order books it streams for USDT-margined perpetual contracts. Binance had reported a security incident on 29–30 October with an estimated impact of about US$6.3 billion, which early findings linked to a compromised engineer's laptop.

Later the same day CoinDCX said futures trading had resumed in all markets except SOPH, ERA, GTC and LA, which stayed in reduce-only mode as a precaution.

On 1 November 2026 Crowdfund Insider published an analysis arguing that the CoinDCX and WazirX hacks revealed significant gaps in resources between Indian exchanges and larger global platforms such as Binance, Bybit and Bitget.

== Related proceedings ==
A separate case, unrelated to either theft, involved the exchange's founders between the two incidents. On 16 March 2026 a First Information Report was registered at Mumbra police station in Thane district on a complaint alleging a loss of ₹71.6 lakh in a purported cryptocurrency investment and franchise scheme. Gupta and Khandelwal were arrested in Bengaluru on 21 March together with four others. CoinDCX called the FIR false and said the fraud had been carried out by impersonators using a lookalike website.

On 24 March a court in Thane district granted both founders bail, holding that no prima facie case had been made out against them. Days later Gupta announced a ₹100 crore initiative against online fraud.

== See also ==
- Cryptocurrency and crime
