= Chainalysis =

American blockchain analysis company

Chainalysis, Inc.
- Industry: Blockchain analysis
- Founded: 2014; 12 years ago
- Founders: Michael Gronager; Jan Møller; Jonathan Levin
- Headquarters: 114 Fifth Avenue. New York City, New York, United States
- Area served: Worldwide
- Key people: Jonathan Levin, CEO
- Number of employees: 900 (2023)
- Website: www.chainalysis.com

Chainalysis is an American blockchain analysis firm headquartered in New York City. The company was co-founded by Michael Gronager, Jan Møller and Jonathan Levin in 2014, and is the first start-up company dedicated to the business of Bitcoin tracing. It offers compliance and investigation software to analyze the blockchain public ledger, which is primarily used to track virtual currencies. Along with banks and brokers its customers have included the United States Federal Bureau of Investigation, Drug Enforcement Administration, and the Internal Revenue Service Criminal Investigation, as well as the United Kingdom's National Crime Agency.

== History ==
Chainalysis was formed to be the official investigator of the hack of cryptocurrency exchange Mt. Gox when Gronager was the COO of Kraken, which was then employed by the bankruptcy trustee for Mt. Gox to investigate the hack. The company was co-founded by Michael Gronager, Jan Møller and Jonathan Levin in 2014.

The company developed proprietary financial crime investigation software which monitors cryptocurrency's public ledger, forming the first full view of transactions on the blockchain.

In March 2021, it partnered with crypto compliance company Notabene to comply with the FATF's Travel Rule across jurisdictions. American business publication Fast Company referred to this partnership one of the top 10 most innovative joint ventures of 2022.

In May 2024, Chainalysis moved its regional headquarters for the Southern Europe, Middle East, Central Asia, and Africa regions to Dubai.

== Noted investigations ==
Chainalysis has helped law enforcement recover cryptocurrencies from illegal enterprises, including, in 2020, assisting law enforcement to recover over $1 billion from the take-down of the dark web marketplace Silk Road. In October 2019, the company helped the United States Department of Justice shut down the world's then-largest child abuse website. Chainalysis also aided in the attribution of seven 2021 cryptocurrency thefts to the North Korean Lazarus Group.

Working with American investigators and the South Korean National Intelligence Service, the company tracked $100 million stolen from a California cryptocurrency firm Harmony to North Korean hackers, who have stolen billions of dollars from banks and cryptocurrency firms, funding its illegal missile program. $1 million of the stolen funds were recovered in April 2023.

In April 2022, Chainalysis came under intense scrutiny during the trial of Roman Sterlingov, who was accused of operating Bitcoin Fog, one of the oldest and most widely used bitcoin mixing services for anonymizing transactions. The U.S. prosecution based a key part of its case on blockchain analysis conducted by Chainalysis to link historical Bitcoin transactions to Sterlingov and argue that he was the operator of the platform.

Several experts and activists questioned the reliability and methodological transparency of the Chainalysis forensic tools used during the trial, arguing that some of the conclusions were probabilistic and difficult to independently audit. They also pointed out that the case could set a problematic precedent by allowing convictions based on proprietary blockchain analysis without sufficient public scrutiny or technical reproducibility.

== See also ==
- Bitcoin network#Criminal activity
- Cryptocurrency and crime
