= Cryptocurrency and crime =

Cryptocurrency has been used extensively in criminal activities, such as investment and romance scams (often called "pig-butchering"), ransomware payments, thefts and exchange hacks, money laundering and sanctions evasion, darknet-market transactions, and off-chain coercion to obtain private keys. Law enforcement notes that investment fraud and laundering are frequent criminal uses of cryptocurrencies, while noting that public blockchains can also aid law enforcement in tracing, seizures, and arrests.

== Background ==
Cryptocurrencies are digital assets transferred on distributed ledgers without a central administrator. Transfers are borderless, typically irreversible, and control depends on possession of private keys rather than accounts held by a single intermediary.

Criminals use cryptocurrencies when they make certain offences easier than traditional methods. This ease is due, for example, to the ability to move funds quickly across borders, take payment without going through banks, and launder proceeds through lightly regulated services. These traits suit offences such as theft, investment fraud and "pig-butchering," ransomware payments, darknet-market trade, money laundering and sanctions evasion.

Since 2019, authorities have tried to limit the criminal misuse of crypto by bringing "virtual assets" and virtual-asset service providers (VASPs) into anti-money-laundering and counter-terrorist-financing (AML/CFT) rules. The standards require licensing or registration, customer due diligence, and the "travel rule" for originator/beneficiary information. Governments pair these with supervision and enforcement (including asset seizures, sanctions, and joint takedowns) and with more cross-border information-sharing among financial-intelligence units and police.

However, offenders still work around these controls. Common methods include routing funds through non-compliant or offshore providers; peer-to-peer transfers and OTC brokers; mixers/tumblers, peel-chain transactions, and cross-chain "hops" via bridges; and other anonymity-enhancing tools, sometimes combined with stolen or synthetic identities at compliant platforms. Uneven implementation of AML/CFT standards (including the travel rule) across jurisdictions remains a widely noted gap, and decentralised or extra-jurisdictional services can be harder to disrupt; many investigations therefore still focus on identifying fiat on-/off-ramps and coordinating across borders.

== Scope and impact ==
The overall scale of crypto-related crime is difficult to measure and figures below are not directly comparable, due to the differences in geographies, methodologies, and crime types. Still, recent indicators give a sense of order of magnitude.

Indicator	Latest figure (year)	Scope / coverage / source
U.S. consumer fraud where cryptocurrency was the payment method	US$1.42 billion (2024)	FTC Consumer Sentinel Data Book 2024; payment-method breakdown (crypto subtotal).
U.S. investment-fraud losses involving cryptocurrency (IC3)	US$9.27 billion (2024)	FBI Internet Crime Report 2024 (cryptocurrency investment fraud).
U.S. complaints referencing cryptocurrency reported to the FBI (IC3)	US$11.366 billion in losses; 181,565 complaints (2025)	FBI Internet Crime Report 2025; covers every complaint flagged with the cryptocurrency descriptor, across all crime types.
Estimated global ransomware payments	~US$813–814 million (2024)	Chainalysis 2025 reporting on 2024 payouts (covered by reliable outlets).
Crypto stolen in hacks (global)	~US$2.2 billion (2024)	Chainalysis year-end estimate for 2024 hacking losses, reported by Reuters.
Value received by identified illicit crypto addresses (global)	US$40.9 billion (2024) (lower-bound)	Chainalysis Crypto Crime report series (value received by addresses classified as illicit; subject to revision as new clusters are identified).
Sanctions-related crypto flows (value received by sanctioned jurisdictions / actors)	≈US$15.8 billion (2024)	Chainalysis estimate for 2024 (≈39% of illicit transactions), reported by AP; see also TRM Labs analysis of sanctions-linked activity.
Illegal online gambling via crypto (GGR)	~US$81.4 billion (2024)	Financial Times, reporting Yield Sec's estimate of gross gaming revenue at crypto casinos (methodology and inference debated).
Darknet-market revenue (global, all goods/services)	~US$1.5 billion (2022)	Chainalysis estimate for annual darknet revenue after the Hydra takedown; provided for scale and historical context.
Illicit/high-risk funds obfuscated via cross-chain swaps/DEXs/bridges (proxy for laundering)	US$21.8 billion (cumulative since 2020; as of May 2025)	Elliptic estimates that >US$21.8 billion of illicit and "high-risk" crypto has been moved via DEXs, cross-chain bridges, and swap services; cumulative and may double-count multi-hop paths.

== Methods ==
=== Fraud ===
==== Exit scams and Ponzi schemes through initial coin offerings (ICOs) ====
Most exit scams (or rugpulls), as well as many ponzi schemes involving cryptocurrencies, are performed through Initial Coin Offerings (ICOs), and Satis Group has reported that almost 80% of all projects launched through an ICO in 2017 were scams. These scams usually involve the perpetrators attracting investments from mostly retail investors, inflating the price and subsequently abandoning the project in question after selling off their own shares.

The novelty of ICOs accounts for the current lack of governmental regulation. This lack of regulatory measures, as well as the pseudonymity of cryptocurrency transactions and their international nature across countless jurisdictions in many different countries, can make it much more difficult to identify and take legal action against perpetrators involved in these scams. Since 2017, the SEC has been actively pursuing groups and individuals responsible for ICO-related scams.

==== Ponzi schemes ====
Ponzi schemes are another common method of utilizing blockchain-based technologies to commit fraud. Most schemes of this sort use multi-level marketing schemes to encourage investors to conduct risky investments. Onecoin is one of the more notable examples of cryptocurrency-ponzi schemes: founded in 2014 by Ruja Ignatova, OneCoin is estimated to have generated US$4 billion in income. While, at least in China, some of the investors' funds have been recovered and several members of the organisation arrested in the U.S., Ignatova herself is still at large. Quadriga was another cryptocurrency ponzi scheme--this time in Canada--which involved $190 million US dollars or $250 million Canadian dollars and was investigated by both the Royal Canadian Mounted Police and the Federal Bureau of Investigation after the death of its owner, Gerald William Cotten, in December 2018.

==== Money laundering ====
Due to the inability of third parties to de-pseudonymize crypto transactions, criminal entities have often resorted to using cryptocurrency to conduct money laundering. ICOs lacking KYC guidelines and anti-money laundering procedures are often used to launder illicit funds, due to the pseudonymity they offer. By using ICOs, criminals launder these funds by buying tokens off of legitimate investors and selling them. This issue is intensified by the lack of measures against money laundering implemented by centralized cryptocurrency exchanges.

A well-known early example of money laundering using cryptocurrencies is Silk Road. Shut down in 2013, with its founder Ross Ulbricht indicted for a money laundering conspiracy among other counts, the website was used for several illicit activities including money laundering solely using bitcoin as a form of payment.

Apart from traditional cryptocurrencies, Non-Fungible Tokens (NFTs) are also commonly used as part of money laundering activities. NFTs are often used to perform Wash Trading by creating several different wallets for one individual, generating several fictitious sales and consequently selling the respective NFT to a third party. According to a report by Chainalysis, these types of wash trades are becoming increasingly popular among money launderers due to the largely anonymous nature of transactions on NFT marketplaces. Auction platforms for NFT sales may face regulatory pressure to comply with anti-money laundering legislation.

===== Regulatory measures =====
Canada is generally regarded as the first state actor to implement regulatory measures dealing with money laundering conducted by the usage of cryptocurrencies. By 2013, the Financial Crimes Enforcement Network (FinCEN) — in direct reference to the centralized exchange Mt. Gox — issued regulations making it clear that all crypto-to-fiat exchangers had to apply KYC- as well as anti-money laundering methods. Any suspicious transactions, therefore, have to be reported to the authorities. Centralized exchanges have to register as money transmitters, with the exact definition of who and what constitutes a money transmitter in the crypto sphere being somewhat blurred and regulations differing between the different states of the U.S. An important exemption from these regulations is decentralized exchanges, due to the fact that they do not hold any fiat currency.

As part of the Fifth Anti-Money Laundering Directive of 2018 and in an effort to combat money laundering and the financing of terrorism, the European Union has issued a directive that all member-states must make sure that crypto exchanges are licensed and registered. The EU is furthermore planning to take measures to ensure that all customers of cryptocurrency exchanges must verify their identity as part of the registration process.

====== Regarding NFTs ======
Auction platforms for NFT sales may face regulatory pressure to comply with anti-money laundering legislation. A February 2022 study from the United States Treasury assessed that there was "some evidence of money laundering risk in the high-value art market," including through "the emerging digital art market, such as the use of non-fungible tokens (NFTs)". The study considered how NFT transactions may be a simpler option for laundering money through art by avoiding transportation or insurance complications in trading physical art. Several NFT exchanges were labeled as virtual asset service providers that may be subject to Financial Crimes Enforcement Network regulations.

The European Union has yet to establish specific regulations to combat money laundering through NFTs. The European Commission announced in July 2022 that it was planning to establish regulations by 2024.

==== Giveaway scam ====
A cryptocurrency giveaway scam involves scammers compromising or impersonating celebrities, influencers, or well-known companies to falsely claim they are multiplying cryptocurrency or giving away free cryptocurrency via airdrop. A variety of methods are used to promote these scams, primarily through posts and livestreams on social media.

YouTube is commonly used to promote this scam. Popular accounts are hacked to stream pre-recorded videos of the impersonated figure, overlaid with fake giveaway announcements that often encourage viewers to visit the scammer's website. In July 2020, Apple co-founder Steve Wozniak and 17 other victims filed a lawsuit against YouTube and its parent company, Google, alleging that the platform allowed scammers to use their name, image and likeness in cryptocurrency giveaway scams. After earlier dismissals based on Section 230, a 2024 California Court of Appeal ruling allowed the case to proceed, finding that YouTube's role may fall outside those legal protections, with the case now pending further proceedings in the lower court.

In the 2020 Twitter account hijacking, 130 high-profile accounts, including those of multi-billionaire Elon Musk and then U.S. president Joe Biden, were used to promote a bitcoin giveaway scam. Within minutes of the initial tweets, more than 320 transactions had been sent to one of the wallet addresses, and over US$110,000 worth of bitcoin had been deposited before the scam messages were removed by Twitter. Coinbase blacklisted the bitcoin address and said they stopped over 1,000 transactions, totaling over US$280,000, from being sent.

==== Paper wallet generators ====
Paper wallet generators allow users to create a wallet address and corresponding private key. While not dubious in itself, fraudsters can create infected generators that secretly communicate the generated keys to the creator, giving them control of the wallet.

In August 2017, a bad actor began advertising an online IOTA wallet seed generator. To gain the victim's trust, they linked to a legitimate GitHub repository, claiming that their website used the same code. In reality, the website used an intentionally predictable random number generator, resulting in the same IOTA wallet seeds being generated. Each of these seeds was logged. On January 19, 2018, the attacker drained approximately US$3.94 million from wallets created during the six-month period. Profiles associated with the website on GitHub, Reddit, and Quora that had provided support to users were deleted, and the website was updated to display the message: "Taken down. Apologies." In January 2019, Europol arrested a 36-year-old man from Oxford, England believed to be behind the attack.

==== Pig butchering ====
A pig-butchering scam or romance baiting scam is a form of online relationship and investment fraud in which perpetrators cultivate fake romantic or social relationships with victims before persuading them to invest money, often in fraudulent cryptocurrency schemes. Such scams are common on social media and dating apps, and often involve catfishing, investment fraud, and romance scams.

=== Malware ===
==== Malware attacks ====
In February 2014, the Pony virus, which spread to between 100,000 and 200,000 computers through a botnet, was reported to have stolen up to US$220,000 in cryptocurrency from 85 wallets. Researchers later discovered updated versions with the ability to steal 30 types of cryptocurrencies.

A type of Mac malware active in August 2013, Bitvanity posed as a vanity wallet address generator and stole addresses and private keys from other bitcoin client software. A different trojan for macOS, called CoinThief, was reported, in February 2014, to be responsible for multiple bitcoin thefts. The software was hidden in versions of some cryptocurrency apps on Download.com and MacUpdate.

==== Stealers and drainers ====
A stealer, also known as a drainer or infostealer, is a type of malware designed to steal private information, including private keys from cryptocurrency wallets, enabling attackers to access and transfer the funds to their wallet. The most common infections scan computers for wallet files and upload them to a remote server, where they can be cracked. Many stealers also incorporate keyloggers to record keystrokes, thus bypassing the need to crack the keys.

==== Clipboard hijacking ====
Clipboard hijacking involves a malware that detects when a cryptocurrency address is copied to the clipboard, and quickly replaces it, in order to trick victims into sending their cryptocurrency to the attacker's address. The method is especially effective due to the difficulty of memorizing or manually typing wallet addresses and the irreversible nature of cryptocurrency transactions.

==== Ransomware ====
Cryptocurrency is considered to be the "near-universal form of payment" for ransomware, a type of malware that encrypts a victim's data until a ransom is paid. Ransomware attacks are estimated to have generated US$1.1 billion in 2019, US$999 million in 2020, a record US$1.25 billion in 2023, and US$813 million in 2024. In 2024, a record breaking US$75 million ransom was paid to the Dark Angels ransomware group by an undisclosed Fortune 500 company.

==== Cryptojacking ====
Cryptojacking is the act of exploiting a computer to mine cryptocurrencies, often through websites, against the user's will or while the user is unaware. One notable piece of software used for cryptojacking was Coinhive, which was used in over two-thirds of cryptojacks before its March 2019 shutdown. The cryptocurrencies mined the most often are privacy coins—coins with hidden transaction histories—such as Monero and Zcash.

Like most malicious attacks on the computing public, the motive is profit, but unlike other threats, it is designed to remain completely hidden from the user. Cryptojacking malware can lead to slowdowns and crashes due to straining of computational resources.

Bitcoin mining by personal computers infected with malware is being challenged by dedicated hardware, such as FPGA and ASIC platforms, which are more efficient in terms of power consumption and thus may have lower costs than theft of computing resources.

=== Off-chain ===
==== Violent crime ====
Some mainstream news outlets have described cases in which kidnappers have targeted cryptocurrency holders in order to compel them to turn over access to their digital wallets. According to reporting citing data from blockchain analysis firm Chainalysis, more than 30 such "wrench attacks" were recorded in 2025, though the firm noted that many crimes may go unreported. One widely reported case involved a cryptocurrency investor who escaped from an apartment in Manhattan after allegedly being held captive for weeks, during which he was beaten and threatened with death in an attempt to force the transfer of digital assets.

==== Energy theft ====
Electricity theft associated with proof-of-work cryptocurrency mining has been reported in multiple countries, with operators illegally bypassing or tampering with meters and power lines to reduce operating costs. In Malaysia, Reuters reported that the national utility company, Tenaga Nasional Bhd, estimated electricity losses of about 4.6 billion ringgit (US$1.11 billion) from power theft linked to illegal cryptocurrency mining between 2020 and August 2025, citing a parliamentary reply from the energy ministry.

=== Fraud factories ===
Fraud factories in Asia traffic workers to scam Westerners into buying cryptocurrencies online.

== Law-enforcement use ==
Law-enforcement agencies and financial-intelligence units report using public-blockchain records to trace illicit flows, identify counterparties at service providers, and recover assets through seizure and forfeiture. In recent operations, tracing supported large seizures linked to investment-fraud schemes; seized assets are typically managed and disposed of by custodial authorities such as the U.S. Marshals Service. Regulators and standard-setters note that FATF Recommendation 15 and related guidance shape cooperation with virtual-asset service providers, while also acknowledging barriers from privacy-enhancing techniques such as mixers and privacy coins. U.S. oversight bodies have likewise highlighted both the promise of on-chain transparency and persistent challenges in sanctions and AML enforcement.

== Notable cases ==
In 2018, around US$1.7 billion in cryptocurrency was lost to scams, theft and fraud. In the first quarter of 2019, such losses rose to US$1.2 billion. 2022 was a record year for cryptocurrency theft, according to Chainalysis, with US$3.8 billion stolen worldwide during 125 system hacks, including US$1.7 billion stolen by "North Korea-linked hackers".

=== ICO-related scams ===
- AriseCoin (AriseBank): AriseBank marketed itself as the world's first decentralized bank, falsely claiming to be able to offer FDIC-insured accounts, VISA cards, and services related to cryptocurrency, amongst other false statements. AriseBank promoted its AriseCoin through celebrity endorsement and social media in order to raise the US$1 billion the company was aiming for. Their ICO was halted by the SEC in early 2018, with their CEO and COO receiving a fine of US$2.7 million.
- BitConnect: Bitconnect was among the highest-performing cryptocurrencies in 2017, promising investors enormous returns through a trading bot. At its height, it reached a market capitalization of US$3.4 billion. In early 2018, the exchange ceased to operate, with investors losing a total of US$14.5 million. It later turned out that the initial profits were generated through a Ponzi scheme by paying earlier customers with money made through newer customers. Legal action against the perpetrators was taken on an international scale.
- Centra: Centra was a Miami-based company that claimed to offer a cryptocurrency-based debit card backed by a VISA and Mastercard. The company raised US$32 million by October 2017 through an ICO and, a few months later, performed an exit scam. In April 2018, two of the founders were arrested. It was soon revealed that neither Mastercard nor VISA backed the company in their alleged efforts.
- Modern Tech (PinCoin/iFan): Based in Vietnam, Modern Tech hosted two separate ICOs for PinCoin and iFan, promising monthly returns of 48%. After the initial success, the founders ran off with approximately US$660 million raised from 32,000 investors. The founders are still at large and none of the funds have been retrieved.
- PlexCoin: The of PlexCoin, Dominic Lacroix and Sabrina Paradis-Rogers, had officy raised around US$15 million through a fraudulent ICO in August 2017 while promising a return of 1,354 % within a month, the SEC. Thed a cthen ivil complaint in December of the same year against them and sought an injunction to cease those sales, freeze the assets involved, pay civil penalties and prohibit the ones responsible behind the token launch from participating in any future offerings of cryptocurrency. Shortly afterwards, Lacroix was sentenced to two months in prison and fined CA$110,000 by the Quebec Superior Court. The SEC's proceedings led to seven-figure fines for the defendants in 2019 and a retrieval of the investors' funds. During the proceedings, the SEC was able to prove that the success of the ICO was inflated by the founders, who in fact had raised US$8.5 million instead of the US$15 million they had announced.

=== Exchanges ===
Notable cryptocurrency exchange compromises resulting in the loss of cryptocurrencies include:

- Between 2011 and 2014, US$350 million worth of bitcoin was stolen from Mt. Gox.
- In 2016, US$72 million was stolen through exploiting Bitfinex's exchange wallet. Users were refunded.
- On December 7, 2017, Slovenian cryptocurrency exchange NiceHash reported that hackers had stolen over $70 million using a hijacked company computer.
- On December 19, 2017, Yapian, the owner of South Korean exchange Youbit, filed for bankruptcy after suffering two hacks that year. Customers were still granted access to 75% of their assets.
- In 2018, cryptocurrencies worth US$400 million were stolen from Coincheck.
- In May 2018, Bitcoin Gold had its transactions hijacked and abused by unknown hackers. Exchanges lost an estimated $18 m and Bitcoin Gold was delisted from Bittrex after it refused to pay its share of the damages.
- In June 2018, South Korean exchange Coinrail was hacked, losing over $37M worth of crypto. The hack worsened an already ongoing cryptocurrency selloff by an additional $42 billion.
- On July 9, 2018, the exchange Bancor, whose code and fundraising had been subjects of controversy, had $23.5 million in cryptocurrency stolen.
- In September 2018, US$60 million in Bitcoin, Bitcoin Cash and Monacoin was stolen from Zaif, a Japanese exchange.
- In May 2019, cryptocurrencies worth US$40 million were stolen from Binance.
- In June 2021, the founders of Africrypt absconded with US$3.6 billion worth of Bitcoin.
- In August 2021, PolyNetwork (DeFi) suffered a loss of US$611 million in a theft.
- In August 2021, Japanese cryptocurrency exchange Liquid was compromised, resulting in a loss of US$97 million worth of digital coins.
- In August 2021, Cream Finance was subject to a US$29 million theft, followed by $130 million on October 28, 2021.
- On December 2, 2021, users of the BadgerDAO DeFi lost around $118,500,000 worth of Bitcoin and $679,000 worth of Ethereum tokens in a front-end attack. A compromised API key of the Cloudflare content delivery network account allowed the injecting of a malicious script into the web interface. BadgerDAO "paused" all smart contracts due to user complaints.
- On December 6, 2021, the cryptocurrency exchange Bitmart lost around $135M worth of Ethereum and an estimated $46 million in other cryptocurrencies, due to a breach of two of its wallets. Although BitMart stated that it would reimburse its clients, many BitMart clients have not received any money from the exchange as of January 2022.
- On December 12, 2021, users of VulcanForge lost around $135M worth of PYR due to breaches of multiple wallets. Partnering centralized exchanges had been notified of the hack and they have pledged to seize any stolen funds upon deposit.
- On January 27, 2022, Qubit Finance (DeFi) lost around $80M worth of Binance Coin due to a flaw in the smart contract that enabled the withdrawal of the said amount in exchange for a deposit of 0 ETH.
- In March 2022, the largest cryptocurrency theft of the year occurred, when US$625 million in ether and USDC was stolen from the Ronin Network. Hacked nodes were finally discovered when a user reported being unable to withdraw funds. The heist was later linked to Lazarus Group, a North Korean state-backed hacking collective, by the U.S. Treasury Department.
- On September 20, 2022, Wintermute was hacked, resulting in theft of US$160 million. The company attributed the vulnerability to a service used by the platform that generates vanity addresses for digital accounts.
- On September 25, 2023, it was reported that $200 million was stolen by hackers from Hong Kong-based crypto firm Mixin Network. The company suspended deposits and withdrawals, stating that the database of its network's cloud service provider was attacked by hackers, resulting in the loss of the assets.
- On February 21, 2025 the exchange Bybit reported the theft of $1.5 billion in ether, estimated at the time to be the largest crypto heist in history. A blockchain analysis firm linked the attack to the Lazarus Group, which had exploited security features in order to transfer the money to multiple unidentified addresses.
- On June 17, 2025 it was reported that there was cyberattack on Iran's biggest cryptocurrency exchange, Nobitex. The attack occurred during the Twelve-Day War. The attack, blamed on the Israel-linked hacker group Gonjeshke Darande, also called "Predatory Sparrow", led to the theft of more than $90 million in digital assets, mostly Tether (USDT), on the Tron network.
- 25 June 2025, law enforcement officials from the Spanish Guardia Civil, Europol and other European countries identified and arrested perpetrators of a cryptocurrency scheme that had laundered EUR 460 million in illicit profits stolen from over 5 000 victims. Leaders of the scam reportedly used a net of associates spread around the world to raise funds through cash withdrawals, bank transfers and crypto-transfers.
- On 29 October 2026, US$6.3 billion worth of digital currency was stolen from Binance.

=== Wallets ===
The Parity Wallet has had two security incidents, amounting to 666,773 ETH lost or stolen. In July 2017, due to a bug in the multi-signature code, 153,037 ETH (approximately US$32 million at the time) was stolen. In November 2017, a subsequent multisignature flaw in Parity made 513,774 ETH (about US$150 million) unreachable; as of March 2019, the funds were still frozen.

=== Energy ===
Notable cases of electricity theft to mine proof-of-work cryptocurrencies include:

- In February 2021, Malaysian police arrested six men involved in a bitcoin mining operation which had stolen US$2 million in electricity.
- In July 2021, Ukrainian authorities shut down an underground gaming and cryptocurrency farm accused of stealing $259,300 of electricity each month.
- In July 2021, Malaysian authorities destroyed 1,069 cryptocurrency mining systems accused of stealing electricity from the grid.
- In May 2021, UK authorities closed a suspected bitcoin mine after Western Power Distribution found an illegal connection to the electricity supply.

=== Blockchains ===
==== Bitcoin ====
There have been many cases of bitcoin theft. As of December 2017, around 980,000 bitcoins—over five percent of all bitcoin in circulation (Note: As of supply count of Bitcoin, 2021-09-23)—had been lost on cryptocurrency exchanges.

One type of theft involves a third party accessing the private key to a victim's bitcoin address, or an online wallet. If the private key is stolen, all the bitcoins from the compromised address can be transferred. In that case, the network does not have any provisions to identify the thief, block further transactions of those stolen bitcoins, or return them to the legitimate owner.

Theft also occurs at sites where bitcoins are used to purchase illicit goods. In late November 2013, an estimated US$100 million in bitcoins were allegedly stolen from the online illicit goods marketplace Sheep Marketplace, which immediately closed. Users tracked the coins as they were processed and converted to cash, but no funds were recovered and no culprits were identified. A different black market, Silk Road 2, stated that, during a February 2014 hack, bitcoins valued at $2.7 million were taken from escrow accounts.

Sites where users exchange bitcoins for cash or store them in "wallets" are also targets for theft. Inputs.io, an Australian wallet service, was hacked twice in October 2013 and lost more than $1 million in bitcoins. GBL, a Chinese bitcoin trading platform, suddenly shut down on 26 October 2013; subscribers, unable to log in, lost up to $5 million worth of bitcoin. In late February 2014, Mt. Gox, one of the largest virtual currency exchanges, filed for bankruptcy in Tokyo amid reports that bitcoins worth US$350 million had been stolen. Flexcoin, a bitcoin storage specialist based in Alberta, Canada, shut down in March 2014 after saying it discovered a theft of about $650,000 in bitcoins. Poloniex, a digital currency exchange, reported in March 2014 that it had lost bitcoins valued at around $50,000. In January 2015, the UK-based bitstamp, the third busiest bitcoin exchange globally, was hacked and US$5 million in bitcoins were stolen. In February 2015, a Chinese exchange named BTER lost bitcoins worth nearly $2 million to hackers.

A major bitcoin exchange, Bitfinex, was compromised by the 2016 Bitfinex hack, when nearly 120,000 bitcoins (around US$71 million) were stolen. Bitfinex was forced to suspend its trading. The theft was the second-largest bitcoin heist ever, dwarfed only by the Mt. Gox theft in 2014. According to Forbes, "All of Bitfinex's customers... will stand to lose money. The company has announced a cut of 36.067% across the board." Following the hack, the company failed to refund customers, though efforts are continuing. In 2022, the US government recovered 94,636 bitcoin (worth approximately $3.6 billion at the time of recovery) from the 2016 thefts of the Bitfinex exchange, reported as the "largest financial seizure" in U.S. history. By February 2022, the amount of bitcoin stolen in 2016 had increased in value to $4.5 billion. Two people were arrested for the thefts in 2022: married couple Ilya "Dutch" Lichtenstein and rapper Heather "Razzlekhan" Morgan were charged with conspiracy to commit money laundering and conspiracy to defraud the United States.

On May 7, 2019, hackers stole over 7000 Bitcoins from the Binance Cryptocurrency Exchange, at a value of over 40 million US dollars. Binance CEO Zhao Changpeng stated: "The hackers used a variety of techniques, including phishing, viruses, and other attacks... The hackers had the patience to wait, and execute well-orchestrated actions through multiple seemingly independent accounts at the most opportune time."

Thefts have raised safety concerns. Charles Hayter, founder of the digital currency comparison website CryptoCompare, described cryptocurrency theft as "a reminder of the fragility of the infrastructure in such a nascent industry." According to the hearing of the U.S. House of Representatives Committee on Small Business on April 2, 2014, "these vendors lack regulatory oversight, minimum capital standards and don't provide consumer protection against loss or theft."

Japan and the United States have accused North Korean hackers of stealing cryptocurrency worth over $300 million from the Japan-based exchange DMM Bitcoin. The theft was attributed to the TraderTraitor group, believed to be part of the Lazarus Group, which is allegedly linked to North Korean authorities. The incident occurred in late May 2024, involving the theft of 4,502.9 bitcoin. The theft involved the hackers using social engineering tactics to impersonate a recruiter on LinkedIn and send a malicious pre-employment test to an employee at a crypto wallet software company. This allowed them to compromise the employee's system and manipulate a legitimate transaction request from DMM, resulting in the loss. The FBI and Japan's National Police Agency are collaborating to combat North Korea's cybercrime activities, which date back to the mid-1990s and include a cyber-warfare unit known as Bureau 121. The Lazarus Group has previously gained notoriety for its involvement in high-profile hacks, including the attack on Sony Pictures in retaliation for the film "The Interview."

==== Ethereum ====
In June 2016, hackers exploited a vulnerability in The DAO to steal US$50 million. Subsequently, the currency was forked into Ethereum Classic, and Ethereum, with the latter continuing with the new blockchain without the exploited translations.

On November 21, 2017, Tether announced that it had been hacked, losing $31 million in USDT from its core treasury wallet. The company has 'tagged' the stolen currency, hoping to 'lock' them in the hacker's wallet, thus making them unspendable.

In 2022, hackers created a signature account on a blockchain bridge called "Wormhole" and stole more than $300 million worth of ether.

=== Other incidents ===
In 2015, two members of the Silk Road Task Force—a multi-agency federal task force that carried out the U.S. investigation of Silk Road—were convicted over charges pertaining to corruption. Former DEA agent, Carl Mark Force, had attempted to extort Silk Road founder Ross Ulbricht ("Dread Pirate Roberts") by faking the murder of an informant. He pleaded guilty to money laundering, obstruction of justice, and extortion under color of official right, and was sentenced to 6.5 years in federal prison. Former U.S. Secret Service agent, Shaun Bridges, pleaded guilty to crimes relating to his diversion of $800,000 worth of bitcoins to his personal account during the investigation, and separately pleaded guilty to money laundering in connection to another cryptocurrency theft. Bridges was sentenced to almost eight years in federal prison.

Gerald Cotten founded QuadrigaCX in 2013, after graduating from the Schulich School of Business in Toronto. Cotten acted as the sole curator of the exchange. Quadriga had no official bank accounts, since banks at the time had no method of managing cryptocurrency. In late 2018, QuadrigaCX, which was, by then, Canada's largest crypto exchange, lost US$190 million in cryptocurrency when the owner died; he was the only one with knowledge of the password to a storage wallet. The exchange filed for bankruptcy in 2019.

In 2018, Ellis Pinsky, 15 years old, was accused of orchestrating a scheme to steal millions of dollars' worth of cryptocurrencies from Michael Terpin, a prominent cryptocurrency investor. The scheme involved a social engineering technique known as a SIM swap attack. The case attracted significant attention due to Pinsky's young age and the substantial amount of money involved. It raised questions about the security of digital assets and the challenges in regulating and prosecuting crimes in the rapidly evolving world of cryptocurrencies. Pinsky later reached a settlement to return $22 million in cryptocurrency to Terpin. In May 2020, Pinsky experienced a home invasion by intruders searching for remaining stolen assets. Michael Terpin, the founder and chief executive officer of Transform Group, a San Juan, Puerto Rico-based company that advises blockchain businesses on public relations and communications, sued Ellis Pinsky in New York on May 7, 2020, for leading a "sophisticated cybercrime spree" that stole US$24 million in cryptocurrency by hacking into Terpin's phone. Terpin also sued Nicholas Truglia and won a $75.8 million judgment against Truglia in 2019 in California state court.

On July 15, 2020, the Twitter accounts of prominent personalities and firms, including Joe Biden, Barack Obama, Bill Gates, Elon Musk, Jeff Bezos, Apple, Kanye West, Michael Bloomberg and Uber were hacked. Twitter confirmed that it was a coordinated social engineering attack on their own employees. Twitter released its statement six hours after the attack took place. Hackers posted messages encouraging users to transfer Bitcoin to a Bitcoin wallet, which would then double the amount. The wallet's balance was expected to increase to more than $100,000 as the message spread among Twitter followers.

In 2021, US authorities carried out a raid on James Zhong's home in Gainesville, Georgia. Authorities found over 51,000 bitcoin that Zhong had stolen from Silk Road between 2012 and 2013. Through an error on Silk Road, Zhong was able to withdraw more bitcoin than was initially deposited. He concealed his identity and was able to evade authorities for nearly a decade. Zhong ended up pleading guilty to wire fraud and was sentenced to 1 year and 1 day in prison along with a forfeiture of all bitcoin.

In 2022, the Federal Trade Commission reported that $139 million in cryptocurrency had been stolen by romance scammers in 2020. Some scammers target dating apps with fake profiles.

In early 2022, the Beanstalk cryptocurrency was stripped of its reserves, which were valued at more than US$180 million, after attackers had managed to use borrowed US$80 million in cryptocurrency to buy enough voting rights to transfer the reserves to their own accounts outside the system. It was initially unclear if such an exploit of governance procedures was illegal.

In 2025, a Nigerian scammer impersonated Trump ally Steve Witkoff by creating a nearly identical email address to solicit a $250,000 cryptocurrency donation from a political donor intended for the Trump-Vance Inaugural Committee. The donor, deceived by the subtle change in the email domain, transferred 250,300 USDT.ETH, which was quickly laundered through multiple wallets. The FBI, with help from Tether and Binance, managed to recover and freeze about $40,300 of the stolen funds, but over $210,000 remains missing. Officials warn that the complexity of blockchain transactions makes recovering stolen crypto extremely difficult.

Josh Garza, who founded the cryptocurrency startups GAW Miners and ZenMiner in 2014, acknowledged in a plea agreement that the companies were part of a pyramid scheme, and pleaded guilty to wire fraud in 2015. The U.S. Securities and Exchange Commission separately brought a civil enforcement action against Garza, who was eventually ordered to pay a judgment of US$9.1 million plus $700,000 in interest. The SEC's complaint stated that Garza, through his companies, had fraudulently sold "investment contracts representing shares in the profits they claimed would be generated" from mining. Garza was later found guilty of fraud, and was ordered by the U.S. Attorney's Office District of Connecticut to pay US$9 million and begin serving a 21-month sentence, commencing January 2019 .

The cryptocurrency community refers to pre-mining, hidden launches, ICO or extreme rewards for the altcoin founders as "deceptive practices". This is, at times, an inherent part of the cryptocurrency's design. Pre-mining refers to the practice of generating the currency before its released to the public.

FTX and Alameda Research founder and CEO Sam Bankman-Fried was indicted by the U.S. District Court for the Southern District of New York in December 2022 and charged with commodities and wire fraud, securities fraud and money laundering, as well as violating campaign finance laws.

In 2025, U.S. authorities led by the Department of Justice and the FBI's San Diego Field Office have seized approximately $2.5 million in cryptocurrency linked to a series of sophisticated fraud schemes. The forfeiture, approved by U.S. District Court, targets criminals who exploited digital financial platforms to defraud victims, often through so-called "confidence schemes." The crackdown involved collaboration with various agencies and support from Tether, a crypto industry company, and aims to both compensate victims and deter future online fraud.

== See also ==
- Bitcoin network § Alleged criminal activity
- Computer security
- Cryptocurrency bubble
- Terrorism financing
- 2025–2026 CoinDCX hacks
