= Bitmart =

Cryptocurrency exchange

BitMart
- Type: Private
- Founded: 2017
- Headquarters: Grand Cayman, Cayman Islands
- Area served: 180+ Countries Worldwide
- Products: Trading and Investment Management Platform
- Services: Digital Asset Trading, Peer-to-Peer Marketplace
- Website: bitmart.com

BitMart is a digital asset trading platform that focuses on cryptocurrency trading, operated by bachi.tech in the Cayman Islands. It is known for a 2021 security breach in which two-thirds of its assets were stolen. It was the subject of the Federal Trade Commission's first cryptocurrency probe in 2022.

== History ==
BitMart was founded in 2017 by Sheldon Xia and specializes in providing tools for buying, selling, and trading to individuals and institutions. It is operated by bachi.tech and based in the Cayman Islands. Public operations began in 2018 when Bitmart was first registered with FinCEN and introduced credit/debit card deposit services through third-party partners, enabling fiat deposits.

In August 2019, Bitmart raised funds in a Pre-A round led by Fenbushi Capital, a blockchain-focused venture capital firm. Bitmart completed a Series B fundraising round led by the New York-based private equity firm Alexander Capital Ventures in November 2021. In September 2025, BitMart introduced the BitMart Card, a Visa-branded debit card that allows users to spend cryptocurrency at merchants and earn tiered cashback. In 2025, BitMart was listed by U.S. News & World Report among recommended cryptocurrency brokers for retail investors.

On January 21, 2026, UNICEF Luxembourg announced a partnership with digital asset platform BitMart to support the Passport to Earning initiative, providing financial literacy and digital skills training to youth aged 15 to 24 in Brazil.

In February 2026, BitMart partnered with crypto payments firm BanXchange to launch the BXE&BitMart U Card, a payment card for spending digital assets. In June 2026, BitMart obtained an Australian Financial Services Licence, bringing its local entity under the supervision of the Australian Securities and Investments Commission following the Corporations Amendment (Digital Assets Framework) Act 2026, which classified eligible digital asset platforms as financial products.

=== Security breach ===
In December 2021, BitMart suffered a security breach in which approximately US$196,000,000 in cryptocurrency was stolen after hackers used a compromised private key to drain two hot wallets linked to the exchange. According to its security firm, the attackers used 1inch to swap the stolen tokens for ethereum, then routed the funds through Tornado Cash to obscure their identities.

BitMart halted withdrawals but kept trading of affected tokens open, and pledged to reimburse all affected users, stating that customer funds were "safe and unharmed." Five weeks later, users reported they had not been repaid. Some pointed to the exchange's recent Series B round of US$13,700,000 at a US$300,000,000 valuation as evidence it lacked the liquidity.

In 2022, the Federal Trade Commission opened its first-ever cryptocurrency investigation into BitMart. The case was dismissed in 2023.
