= Bybit =

Dubai-based cryptocurrency exchange

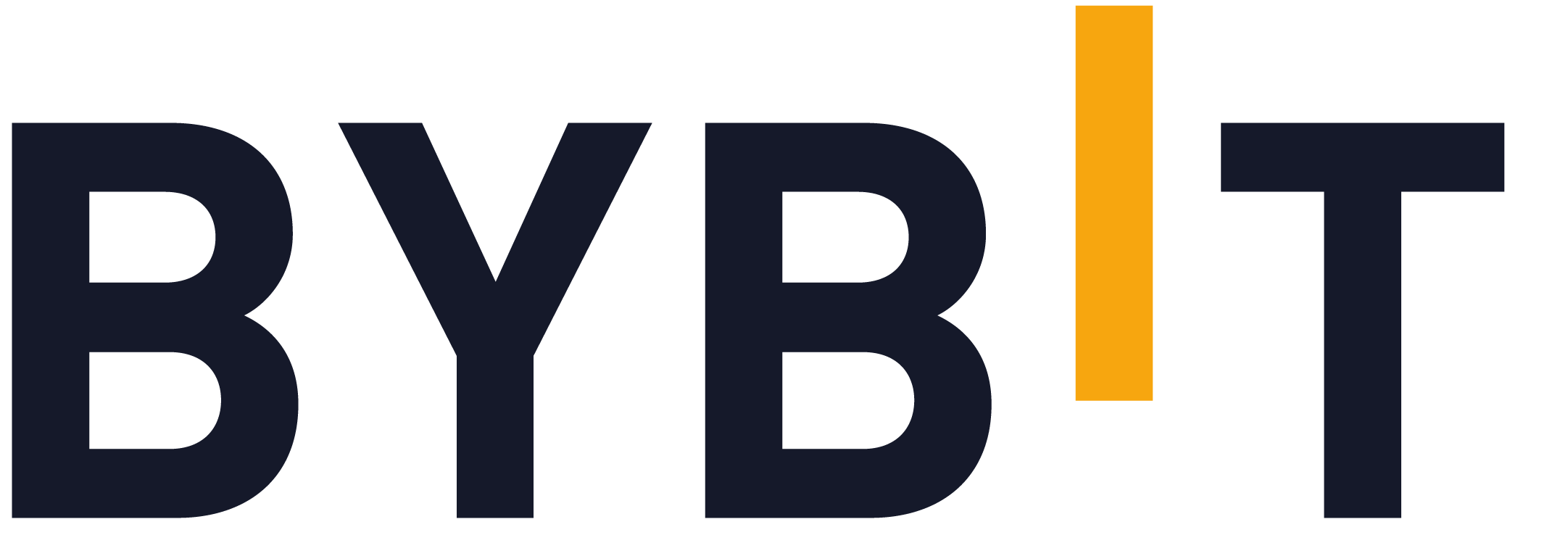
- Type: Private
- Industry: Cryptocurrency
- Founded: 2018; 8 years ago in Shanghai, China
- Founder: Ben Zhou
- Headquarters: Dubai, United Arab Emirates
- Key people: Ben Zhou (CEO)
- Services: Cryptocurrency exchange Derivatives trading
- Website: bybit.com

Bybit is a Dubai-based cryptocurrency exchange that was originally founded in China. The platform has faced regulatory warnings in several jurisdictions.

In February 2025, the exchange was hacked resulting in the loss of $1.5 billion in assets. This marked the largest cryptocurrency theft on record until the $6.3 billion hack of Binance in October 2026.

== History ==
=== Early history ===
Bybit was founded in 2018 in Shanghai, China by Ben Zhou who had previously worked as the China general manager of the forex brokerage XM. After China banned cryptocurrency mining and trading in 2021, Zhou moved the team to Singapore.

In 2022, Bybit moved its headquarters to Dubai, United Arab Emirates.

In November 2023, the FTX bankruptcy estate sued Bybit for nearly $1 billion. It alleged that Bybit's investment arm Mirana prioritized withdrawals from FTX in November 2022 amid concerns about its solvency and withdrew nearly $500 million before withdrawals stopped. The suit claimed that Bybit used FTX assets to expedite withdrawals, blocked FTX from reclaiming $125 million, and devalued tokens worth tens of millions through BitDAO. FTX also contended that a token swap with Alameda Research in October 2021 was reversed in May 2023, when BitDAO restructured tokens, limiting redemption rights. In October 2024, Bybit settled its FTX case by paying $228 million.

=== 2025 hack ===
On February 21, 2025, Bybit announced on X that it had been hacked. According to Bybit, about 400,000 Ethereum was stolen, which had an approximate notional value of $1.4 billion, making it the largest cryptocurrency exchange hack at the time. It was surpassed in October 2026 by the theft of about $6.36 billion from Binance. The firm reported that it was able to replenish its reserves within 72 hours by securing 447,000 ether tokens through emergency funding efforts. The liquidity was provided by firms including Galaxy Digital, FalconX and Wintermute.

The attacker exploited vulnerabilities in Bybit's multi-signature wallet system, facilitated by compromised infrastructure at Safe{Wallet}, a third-party provider.

Blockchain analytics firms Arkham Intelligence and Elliptic claimed they were able to trace the hack to Lazarus Group, an advanced persistent threat tied to North Korea. The US Federal Bureau of Investigation also attributed the hack to North Korea, blaming "TraderTraitor actors". By February 27, 2025, MetaMask head of security Taylor Monahan estimated that the attackers had moved at least 209,384 ether into bitcoin, more than half of the ether stolen. According to Arkham Intelligence, at least $240 million of the funds had been laundered through the THORChain protocol.

On November 3, 2026, in reaction to the suspicion of North Korean involvement in the 2026 Binance hack, high-ranking party official Kim Yo Jong, sister of North Korean Leader Kim Jong Un, denied through a press statement any North Korean involvement.

== Products ==
In June 2026, Bybit announced plans to offer retail customers access to tokenized initial public offerings at IPO prices through Payward's xStocks platform, beginning with SpaceX.

== Sponsorships ==
In 2021, Bybit became a global main sponsor of the Argentina national football team under an initial two-year agreement. In August 2021, Bybit sponsored Ukrainian esports organization Natus Vincere (NAVI) in a three-year deal. Soon after, Bybit signed a similar agreement with Danish esports club Astralis featuring its branding on uniforms.

In early 2022, Formula One team Red Bull Racing announced a multi-year partnership with Bybit. The sponsorship ran through the 2022 to 2023 seasons, and concluded at the end of 2024 by mutual agreement.

== Legal status ==
The platform has faced regulatory warnings in several jurisdictions.

=== Austria ===
In May 2025, Bybit was authorised as a crypto-asset service provider under the European Union's Markets in Crypto-Assets Regulation by the Austrian Financial Market Authority. On 4 August 2026, the Financial Market Authority granted Bybit Payments GmbH an electronic money institution licence, permitting it to issue electronic money and provide specified payment services.

=== Brazil ===
Bybit entered Brazil in April 2022 and made an investment of US$50 million. In an act dated September 2, 2022, the securities regulator Comissão de Valores Mobiliários (CVM) ordered Bybit Fintech Limited to suspend any public offering of securities intermediation services to Brazilian investors, under threat of a daily fine of R$1,000. Bybit stopped offering derivatives to Brazilian users from September 15, 2022, while its spot trading continued.

As of September 2026, Bybit had more than 200,000 active users in Brazil with an operational office in São Paulo.

=== Canada ===
In June 2022, Bybit reached a settlement with the Ontario Securities Commission under which it agreed to pay more than US$2.4 million. In May 2023, it withdrew from the Canadian registration process and left Canada, telling its Canadian users that their positions would be liquidated if they did not withdraw their holdings by September 30, 2023.

=== India ===
In January 2025, Bybit suspended trading for users in India from January 12, while keeping withdrawals available, as it sought registration as a virtual digital asset service provider with the Financial Intelligence Unit – India (FIU-IND). In an order dated January 31, 2025, India's Financial Intelligence Unit (FIU-IND) fined Bybit ₹92.7 million for violations of the Prevention of Money Laundering Act, after finding that the exchange had continued providing services in India without mandatory registration. Bybit subsequently paid the penalty and registered with FIU-IND.

=== Indonesia ===
In July 2024, Indonesia's communications ministry blocked the Instagram accounts of Bybit, Bybit Indonesia and several other cryptocurrency exchanges. The ministry said that it blocked such accounts only at the request of the Financial Services Authority (OJK) or the commodity futures regulator Bappebti, and Bappebti said that the blocked companies were not licensed to operate in Indonesia. In April 2026, Bybit acquired a majority stake in PT Enkripsi Teknologi Handal, which held an OJK licence to operate the exchange NOBI; the business was renamed Bybit Indonesia and began operating under OJK supervision in July 2026.

=== Malaysia ===
In December 2024, the Securities Commission Malaysia directed Bybit Technology Ltd to stop operating its website, mobile applications and other digital platforms in Malaysia within 14 business days of December 11, 2024, as operating a digital asset exchange without registration was an offence under the Capital Markets and Services Act 2007.

=== Netherlands ===
In October 2024, De Nederlandsche Bank imposed a €2.25 million administrative fine on Bybit Fintech Limited for providing cryptocurrency services in the Netherlands without the required registration. The regulator said it had reduced the penalty to reflect steps taken to address the breach, including transferring Dutch customers to a local partner.

=== Russia ===
Bybit operated in Russia until 2025 and offered registration, verification, and a Russian-language interface. In November 2025, its European subsidiary suspended account opening for Russian citizens, and later blocked the accounts of Russian users in early March without apparent reason.

=== Singapore ===
As of 2026, Bybit has no operations in Singapore. After the Monetary Authority of Singapore (MAS) extended its licensing requirements in 2025 to Singapore-based digital asset firms serving overseas customers, Bybit made plans to move its local operations out of the country. In June 2026, MAS added Bybit Fintech Ltd to its investor alert list; Bybit said that it did not serve users in Singapore and that it was engaging with MAS to understand the basis for the listing.

In 2023, in a case brought by Bybit against an employee of its payroll contractor who had diverted about 4.2 million Tether (USDT) tokens from the company, the High Court of Singapore held that USDT is property capable of being held on trust. In January 2025, she was jailed for six weeks for contempt of court after spending the funds in breach of court orders.

=== Turkey ===
Bybit Türkiye, operated by the Turkish company Narkasa Yazılım Ticaret, was among the cryptocurrency service providers that applied to Turkey's Capital Markets Board (SPK) for a licence and was included on the board's list of providers in operation. By July 2025, the list included Bybit Kripto Varlık Alım Satım Platformu.

=== United Arab Emirates ===
In March 2022, Bybit received in-principle approval to conduct virtual asset business in Dubai. It later held a provisional licence under the framework of Dubai's Virtual Assets Regulatory Authority (VARA). In February 2025, it received in-principle approval from the federal Securities and Commodities Authority (SCA), which granted it a full virtual asset platform operator licence in October 2025.

=== United Kingdom ===
In March 2021, Bybit ceased serving users in the United Kingdom (UK) in response to the Financial Conduct Authority's (FCA) ban on retail cryptocurrency derivatives, which took effect on January 6, 2021. Furthermore, Bybit was blocked from operating in the United States.
