= Movie4k =

Web search index for online videos

Movie4k.to
- Website type: Video on demand website
- Available in: German, English, Russian, French, Italian, Turkish, Japanese
- Revenue: Banner ads
- Commercial: Yes
- Registration: Optional
- Current status: Offline

Movie4k.to, formerly Movie2k.to, is a user-contributed video directory for television programs and films. It is an aggregation-website acting as a search index for online videos. In May 2013, Movie2k.to was shut down by the Motion Picture Association of America (MPAA) due to copyright infringement concerns, but shortly after reopened as Movie4k.to. It primarily serves English and German-speaking areas. However, the site is also no longer accessible in the UK, Denmark, and customers of some ISPs in Austria due to ISPs blocking the site.

== History ==
In 2011, the Motion Picture Association of America (MPAA) classified Movie2k.to as a "notorious market" for piracy in a letter to the United States House of Representatives. The federal government of the United States had intentions to shut down video directories, such as Movie2k.to; however, some of these proposals were hindered because of their foreign headquarters. Movie2k.to was based in Romania at this time. Two years later, on May 29, 2013, the website was unexpectedly shut down by the MPAA because of a court order. Initial claims asserted that the operators were caught. The website had already been blocked earlier that month in the United Kingdom by major ISPs due to copyright infringement concerns.

Shortly after its closure, there are possibilities that another website, Movie4k.to, would launch. Investigation began when the website was redirected to another page labeled with a short note. The IP address, edited significantly on May 30, 2013 shortly after Movie2k.to's closure, was registered to a server in the British Virgin Islands. It was initially created in 2011, but was never used until 2013. On June 1, 2013, Movie2k.to re-opened as Movie4k.to. The developers released a statement regarding the closure of Movie2k.to, on their website. They criticized the laws of piracy, claiming that it does not compare to a violent crime as police make it seem, in their opinion. They also criticized how the act was money driven, saying "[according to current laws] money is way more important than a unique human life." Several people were angered by the initial closure by the MPAA.

== Function ==
The website provides a detailing listing of television programs and films, and aggregates the media content available on the Internet. Movie4k.to does not host any content, and instead acts as a search index for streaming sources. The directory supports user-submitted links by registered editors. It is available in German, English, Russian, French, Italian, Turkish, and Japanese. Another function of the site is that of a site guide or directory. Movie4k.to contains a comprehensive directory of video websites, mostly on the television and film pages.

As of May 2013, the website is the 202nd most popular website in the world, with a major effect in Germany, where it is ranked as among the 20 German websites with the most viewers, making it more popular than Apple, Microsoft, PayPal, iTunes, and Twitter, according to Alexa Internet. It is the largest streaming portal in the country. The present version from June 2013 has been ranked 63,540 most viewed in Germany since its initial debut.

== Legal status ==
In an interview with Welt Online, an alleged operator of Movie2k.to claimed they do not operate from Germany due to the fear of civil lawsuits from copyright holders. Film companies and the Gesellschaft zur Verfolgung von Urheberrechtsverletzungen (GEMA) deem the website's offerings illegal and label it an illegal streaming portal.

In November 2019, a main Movie2k operator and programmer was arrested. He confessed to earning over 22,000 Bitcoins (worth more than 25 million euros) through advertising and subscription traps on the site. These funds were voluntarily surrendered as restitution, according to the Dresden State Prosecutor's Office. Per a 2017 European Court of Justice ruling, using streaming portals with obviously copyrighted content constitutes copyright infringement and can result in civil and criminal consequences for users.

== Blocking ==
=== Austria ===
In late July 2017, citing a Supreme Court decision allowing ISP blocks for copyright infringement, the Austrian Anti-Piracy Association (VAP) requested that network operators UPC Austria, A1 Telekom Austria, Tele2, and Drei block access to several portals, including Movie4k.to. The move was likely prompted by copyright violations involving films from Allegro Film, Wega Film, and Epo-Film.

=== Iran ===
On December 20, 2024 at 12:01:25 AM UTC, movie4k.to was blocked in Iran.

=== India ===
All Internet Service Providers in India have blocked access to websites that are alleged to host or distribute copyrighted content without authorization. These restrictions are implemented in compliance with court orders and government regulations related to copyright enforcement. As a result Movie4k.to and similar websites are blocked in India.
