= Arkham (cryptocurrency exchange) =

American blockchain analytics company

Arkham Intelligence
- Type: Private
- Industry: Blockchain analytics
- Founded: January 2020 in San Francisco, United States
- Founder: Miguel Morel
- Headquarters: Dominican Republic
- Area served: Worldwide
- Products: Blockchain intelligence platform, API, data analytics
- Website: arkm.com

Arkham (legally named Arkham Intelligence, Inc.) is an American blockchain analytics company. Its platform, Arkham Intel, attributes blockchain addresses to the individuals and organizations that control them, allowing users to analyze cryptocurrency activity linked to real-world entities. Arkham offers a free web platform alongside paid enterprise and API products.

Founded by Miguel Morel in 2020, Arkham uses AI to identify and catalog the owners of blockchain addresses. The company's stated aim of deanonymizing blockchain activity has drawn criticism from privacy advocates. Its headquarters are based in the Dominican Republic, with additional offices in London and New York City. Arkham has partnerships with brands and sports teams, including the Galatasaray S.K., the Professional Fighters League, and Tommy Paul.

== History ==
Morel founded Arkham in 2020 and received investments from angel investors including Tim Draper, Joe Lonsdale of Palantir Technologies, and Sam Altman of OpenAI and Worldcoin.

In July 2022, during the midst of Celsius Network’s bankruptcy, Arkham found that Celsius owed over $500 million worth of digital assets to three of the biggest DeFi lenders, including Aave Protocol; it was also reported that Celsius worked with a previously unidentified fund manager to purchase NFTs and make deposits on yield-bearing decentralized exchanges.

Arkham reported on a hacker who stole approximately $477 million worth of tokens from FTX and sent 180,000 Ethereum (ETH) coins to at least a dozen digital wallets in November 2022. Arkham analysts noted that the hacker followed two patterns: operating between 08:00 and 10:00 UTC and creating new accounts for each operation.

In December 2022, Arkham tracked over $1 million of transferred funds tied to former FTX chief executive Sam Bankman-Fried as well as $1.7 million worth of cryptocurrencies liquidated within a 24-hour time span. This data was used by prosecutors from the Southern District of New York, who filed criminal charges against Bankman-Fried for his role in FTX's collapse.

Arkham provided data in January 2023 that identified “an alleged nexus of money laundering” from Bitzlato through intermediate wallets of Binance. Over the course of several years, it was found that the intermediary wallet deposited $15 million worth of crypto onto Binance's platform. That same month, Arkham released a report which revealed that Alameda liquidators lost $72,000 worth of crypto while trying to recover funds as part of FTX's bankruptcy.

In June 2024, Arkham offered a $150,000 bounty on its Intel Exchange, which was solved and paid out, to anyone who discovered who was behind the DJT crypto asset. During an X Spaces event earlier that month, Martin Shkreli claimed that he and Barron Trump were behind the Trump-branded cryptocurrency.

In July 2024, Arkham tracked the German Government's movements of Bitcoin to centralized crypto exchanges like Coinbase, Kraken, and Bitstamp as it completely sold off its nearly 50,000 BTC holdings worth more than $2 billion at the time. German authorities had seized the Bitcoin from the operators of Movie2k.to and transferred it to a crypto wallet Arkham identified as being owned by Germany’s Federal Criminal Police Office.

Arkham tagged the cryptocurrency wallets of Mt. Gox, the defunct cryptocurrency exchange, which as of July 2024 held nearly 140,000 bitcoin. Arkham users were then able to track the onchain movements of those holdings, worth billions of dollars, as the trustee began making repayments to creditors. Other notable blockchain identifications include Robinhood Markets and Justin Sun.

In July 2024, Arkham signed a two-season sponsorship deal with Turkish Süper Lig football team Galatasaray.

In October 2024, Arkham announced plans to launch a cryptocurrency derivatives exchange aimed at retail traders. Arkham Exchange added spot trading in several U.S. states in early 2025 and released a mobile app in December 2025. In February 2026, CoinDesk reported that the exchange was being closed after failing to attract significant trading volume; Morel responded that it was moving from a centralized to a decentralized model.

In October 2026, Arkham launched Arkham Enterprise, a paid tier aimed at professional and institutional users, with some tracing tools restricted to Enterprise customers. The same month, Arkham's API became available on the Google Cloud Marketplace.

== Token ==
Arkham token

Denominations
- Code: ARKM

Development
- White paper: Arkham Whitepaper
- Initial release: July 2023; 3 years ago
- Development status: Active

Ledger
- Block explorer: intel.arkm.com

Valuation
- Exchange rate: Floating

The ARKM token was launched in July 2023 as the native token of the Arkham Intel Exchange, a marketplace where users can post and claim bounties for information about the ownership of blockchain addresses. Originally released on Binance Launchpad, ARKM launched at a price of $0.05 and reached a price of $3.98 in March 2024. As of August 2025, the market capitalization for the ARKM token is US$107.336 million.
