= Poly Network exploit =

2021 cybersecurity incident

The Poly Network exploit was an attack conducted by anonymous hackers on August 10, 2021. The attack transferred over $610 million in digital cryptocurrency to the hackers. All assets were returned to Poly Network over the following 15 days. It was one of the largest security incidents in DeFi's history in terms of mark-to-market value.

== Background ==
Poly Network is an interoperability protocol that lets users trade one cryptocurrency for another, such as trading Bitcoin for Ethereum. Before the attack, Poly Network had transferred $10 billion in digital assets between blockchains, with total value of nearly $1 billion.

== Attack ==
The hackers transferred approximately $610 million of the most valuable digital assets to three addresses they controlled on Ethereum, Binance Smart Chain and Polygon.

After the attack, the Poly team asked exchanges and miners to be aware of the flow of stolen tokens and called for the hacker's transactions to be stopped, Tether froze $33 million worth of USDT. In an open letter on Twitter, the Poly team wanted to establish communication with the hackers and urge them to return the stolen tokens.

The hackers announced on August 11, 2021 that they had been planning to return the tokens. They claimed that the purpose of the theft was to reveal vulnerabilities and secure Poly Network. They posted a Q&A to communicate with the public by embedding messages in transactions with their addresses.

The hackers required multi-signature addresses for transfer. Poly Network generated a collection address and started to recover the assets that were returned first on August 11. On August 13, the hackers returned assets worth $340 million and transferred the bulk of the rest to a multi-signature address jointly controlled by them and Poly Network.

After receiving tokens, Poly Network started to address the hackers as "Mr. White Hat" and offered to reward them with a $500,000 bug bounty and the position of "chief security advisor" of Poly Network, as a strategy to ensure safe return of the rest of the affected assets.

The last of the hacked money was returned to Poly Network on August 25.

== Reaction ==
Poly Network's decision to refer to the hackers as "white hats" angered some in the security world who worried that it might set a precedent for criminal hackers to whitewash their actions. White hat hacker Katie Paxton-Fear said that "labelling this hack as a white hat is really disappointing". Charlie Steele, former Department of Justice and FBI official, thought "Private companies have no authority to promise immunity from criminal prosecution," and "in this event where a hacker stole the $600m 'for fun' and then returned most of it, all while remaining anonymous, is not likely to lessen regulators' concerns about the variety of risks posed by cryptocurrencies."

== Aftermath ==
Poly Network launched the global bug bounty program on Immunefi. The program aims to encourage more security agencies and white hat organizations to participate in the audit of Poly Network's core functions, especially to address potential security risks. Rewards are distributed according to the impact of the vulnerability based on the Immunefi Vulnerability Severity Classification System — the rewards range up to $100,000 for critical vulnerabilities.
