= DLive =

American video live streaming service

- Website type: Livestreaming
- Founded: December 2017; 8 years ago
- Dissolved: April 27, 2026
- Area served: Worldwide
- Founders: Charles Wayn; Cole Chen
- Industry: Internet
- Parent: Rainberry, Inc.
- Website: dlive.tv
- Commercial: Yes
- Registration: Optional
- Launched: September 2018; 8 years ago (relaunch)
- Current status: Fully closed

DLive was an American video live streaming service that was founded in 2017. It was purchased by BitTorrent, Inc. in 2019. Due to the site's lax enforcement of prohibited content guidelines, DLive had become a popular alternative to YouTube and Twitch among white supremacists, conspiracy theorists, neo-Nazis, neo-fascists, and extremists. The site was also used by gamers as an alternative to Twitch.

DLive used a blockchain for its donation systems. It originally operated on the Steemit blockchain, before switching to the Lino network upon its relaunch in September 2018, and later TRON network after its 2019 purchase by BitTorrent.

On April 7, 2026, the company announced that the platform would be shutting down by the end of the month. On April 22, the official closing time was announced to be April 27, at PM UTC+8 via their social media. As of 18:46, Saturday, November 7, 2026 (UTC), accessing the DLive domain redirects to a page with a short farewell message.

== Company history ==
DLive was founded in December 2017 by Charles Wayn and Cole Chen, who studied at the University of California, Berkeley. Initially based on the Steem blockchain, it was relaunched in September 2018 on the Lino Network blockchain. With the launch, DLive billed itself as a streaming site which did not take a cut of streamers' revenue, a policy that lasted until December 2020. Instead, 90.1% of subscription and gift revenues went directly to streamers while the other 9.9% was streamers' daily performance on the site.

Right-wing conspiracy theorist Alex Jones temporarily moved to DLive after being banned from YouTube, but was also banned by DLive for violating its community guidelines in April 2019. By that month, DLive self-reported 3 million monthly active users and 35,000 active streamers. In the same month, YouTuber PewDiePie signed an exclusive livestreaming deal with DLive, which lasted until his return to YouTube in May 2020. In the two months after the signing, DLive's userbase grew by 67%.

By late 2019, DLive was purchased by BitTorrent. BitTorrent was itself owned by cryptocurrency entrepreneur Justin Sun's TRON Foundation, so DLive switched from the Lino Network to the TRON network.

Towards the end of 2019, DLive began attracting users from the far-right because of its lax enforcement of prohibited content guidelines. A whistleblower told Time in August 2020 that DLive was "turning a blind eye" to hate speech and misinformation on the platform: "They care more about having good numbers than weeding these people out". Internal emails obtained by The New York Times show that Wayn wanted to suspend some white supremacists and Neo-Nazis in 2020, but decided not to because it would hamper DLive's growth. Wayn hoped to dilute their presence with growth of non-political video game streamers. In June 2020, amidst the George Floyd protests, DLive changed its Twitter profile to "All Lives Matter", which Time called a "right-wing rallying cry in response to Black Lives Matter". By August 2020, the most popular programming on DLive included anti-vaccination content, COVID-19 misinformation, and opposition to racial justice movements. In October 2020, QAnon streamers joined the platform after being deplatformed from YouTube.

On April 7, 2026 DLive announced that it would be closing its platform, and asked users to withdraw any cryptocurrency and download content stored on the site before the end of the month.

== User base and far-right content ==
DLive viewers can tip content creators with a currency called "lemons". Many of the site's far-right streams are only accessible after opting to see "x-tagged" content.

Unlike right-wing media alternatives such as Gab and Parler, DLive's donation and subscription system offers a monetization system, and top streamers make over $100,000. To facilitate donations, the site is integrated with Streamlabs. In August 2020, eight of DLive's top ten earners according to Social Blade were far-right extremists or conspiracy theorists. On two dates analyzed by Time, in June and August 2020, far right extremist channels captured 96% of all viewers and 99% of viewers of Top 20 channels. Megan Squire, a professor of computer science at Elon University and researcher of far-right online communities, has described DLive as a gamified service that acts as a significant source of funding for white supremacists and other extremists: "The top earners on the platform – by far – are white nationalist Nick Fuentes and 'alt-right' entertainer Owen Benjamin." DLive also hosts former Identity Evropa leader Patrick Casey and Neo-Nazi Matthew Q. Gebert.

A former DLive employee, who spoke anonymously to Time magazine, stated that as political channels on the service became increasingly popular in 2019, they devolved into "streams dedicated to white pride and a lot of anti-Semitism, entire streams talking about how Jewish people are evil". Joan Donovan, the research director of Harvard's Shorenstein Center, stated in August 2020: "On DLive, the gloves are off, and it's just full white-supremacist content with very few caveats."

=== Use in U.S. Capitol attack ===
During the attack at the United States Capitol on January 6, 2021, at least nine DLive streams were online streaming their involvement in the day's events. Most notable among them was alt-right figure Tim Gionet, under the name "Baked Alaska", who earned more than $2,000 from tips that day and received messages on where to go into the building from his DLive chat. A Proud Boys associated account called "Murder the Media", a phrase that was written on the door of the US Capitol, also streamed. In response, on January 9, DLive suspended the accounts of Baked Alaska, Murder the Media, and four other accounts that had participated. It also suspended the account of white nationalist Nick Fuentes, one of the site's most popular creators and a leader of the "Groyper" movement. The site balances of those accounts were frozen and future donations refunded.

One week after the attack, white supremacist and Groyper Patrick Casey was using the site to downplay the significance of the riot while acknowledging that "our days on DLive seem to be numbered."

An analysis performed in January 2021 following the attack showed that approximately 95 percent of the views on DLive's streams that day went to far-right streamers, at least nine of which were present at the Capitol. After the storming, Jewish-American magazine The Forward wrote a piece describing DLive as "A safe haven for Neo-Nazis".

On February 9, Representatives Raja Krishnamoorthi and Jackie Speier sent a letter to DLive calling on the company to explain how it moderates extremist content, specifically requesting information on anonymous funding of bad actors and whether or not the company still intended to tolerate extremists using the platform to advocate for offline violence.

DLive has also been used by several channels to promote the discredited and disproven QAnon conspiracy theory. As of March 2021, DLive streams "Patriots' Soapbox", a relatively high-profile QAnon channel.

== See also ==
- List of social networking services
- 4chan
- 8chan
- Minds
- Voat
