= Eric Klinker =

American technology executive

Eric Klinker is an American technology executive and entrepreneur, best known as the former CEO of BitTorrent. Along with Bram Cohen and three other venture capitalists, he is also on the board of governors of BitTorrent. He was instrumental in formulating BitTorrent's position on network neutrality, testifying before the FCC as well as other worldwide telecom regulators.

As CEO, he is credited with guiding BitTorrent through the 2008 financial crisis and growing the user base to over 170m users. In 2012, BitTorrent expanded its mission under Klinker and broadened the product portfolio, introducing additional distributed applications like BitTorrent Sync, BitTorrent Bundles, Bleep, and BitTorrent Live, a linear broadcasting P2P protocol also invented by Bram Cohen. In 2014, BitTorrent announced Project Maelstrom, a distributed web browser designed to power a new way for web content to be published, accessed and consumed. In 2016, Klinker introduced Sync IT, a platform enabling IT professionals to utilize peer-to-peer architecture for large-scale data orchestration and transfer.

In April 2016, Klinker left BitTorrent to co-found Resilio Inc. with a focus on applying BitTorrent technology to enterprise and IoT markets.

== Early life ==
Raised in Ramsey, Illinois, Klinker attended the University of Illinois at Urbana–Champaign and the Naval Postgraduate School. In 2013, he received the University of Illinois' ECE Distinguished Alumni Award, recognized for pioneering efficient, massive data-streaming protocols and leading the industry in load-aware routing. Before joining BitTorrent, he held roles at @Home Network, netVmg, and Internap Network Services.

== netVmg ==
netVmg was a privately held Fremont, California-based startup founded in 2000 that developed intelligent route control software and appliances, enabling enterprises with multiple ISP connections to automatically direct traffic over the best-performing network path and avoid congestion. The company attracted more than US$57 million in venture capital investment and counted customers including Charles Schwab, Safeway, nVIDIA, and ADP. Klinker joined netVmg as an early engineer and rose through the organization to become CTO and Chief Architect, playing a central role in designing the company's core route-control platform.

In October 2003, Internap Network Services (Nasdaq: INAP), an Atlanta-based provider of performance-based Internet routing services, acquired netVmg in an all-stock transaction.

The acquisition allowed Internap to extend its service-level agreements beyond its own network points of presence to individual customer sites, offering end-to-end performance guarantees. Internap planned to integrate the netVmg Flow Control Platform (FCP) appliance with its own Assimilator route-control platform into a unified customer premises product line. Klinker subsequently joined Internap as part of the acquisition, as CTO and Vice President of Engineering until 2007, before moving to BitTorrent.

== Resilio, Inc. ==
=== Founding ===
In April 2016, Klinker left BitTorrent to co-found Resilio, Inc., incorporated and headquartered in Pleasanton, California. The company was formed to commercialize the peer-to-peer synchronization technology pioneered by BitTorrent Sync, which was formally spun out of BitTorrent Inc. on 1 June 2016 as an independent entity. Klinker was Chief Executive Officer from the company's founding, with a strategic focus on applying BitTorrent protocol technology to enterprise and IoT markets.

=== Products and technology ===
Resilio's core platform is built on a distributed, peer-to-peer (P2P) architecture that enables high-speed file synchronization across hybrid cloud, on-premises, and edge networks. Unlike traditional hub-and-spoke file-replication systems, the approach enables every endpoint to participate in the synchronization process simultaneously, allowing data transfers at speeds up to ten times faster than conventional client-server methods, while also scaling to hundreds of millions of files.

The company's initial enterprise offering, Resilio Connect, targeted large-scale server synchronization, content distribution, and hybrid-work use cases. It incorporated built-in WAN optimization to overcome high-latency and packet-loss conditions across satellite (VSAT), cellular, and other constrained network links. Resilio Connect achieved SOC 2 Type 1 certification in 2023, validating its enterprise security posture and compliance with AES-256 encryption standards.

In 2024, Klinker oversaw the evolution of the platform into the Resilio Active Everywhere Platform (version 4.0), unveiled at the NAB Show in April 2024. The platform extended the company's capabilities beyond server synchronization to include policy-based global file caching and data orchestration for hybrid infrastructure environments. Resilio Active Everywhere was named Product of the Year in the IT Networking Infrastructure and Security category at NAB Show 2024.

Earlier, in June 2023, Resilio had announced that preliminary internal testing of its scale-out architecture — which horizontally pools multiple Resilio agents to transfer and synchronise unstructured data in parallel — combined with its ZGT WAN acceleration technology had achieved peak aggregate data transfer speeds exceeding 100 Gb/s, including transferring a 1 TB dataset between Microsoft Azure regions in 90 seconds.

=== Market and customers ===
Resilio's platform was adopted primarily by enterprises with large volumes of unstructured data and geographically distributed teams, including organizations in the media and entertainment, manufacturing, energy, and enterprise IT sectors. The platform's Hybrid Work capability enabled remote workers to access a consistent, locally cached view of corporate file systems without the use of VPNs. Notable customers included Infobip, a global omnichannel communications provider.

== Acquisition by Nasuni and Vista Equity Partners ==
=== Acquisition of Resilio (2026) ===
On 4 March 2026, Nasuni Corporation announced the completed acquisition of Resilio, Inc. The transaction brought Resilio's file synchronization and edge-caching technology into the Nasuni File Data Platform, combining Nasuni's cloud-native file services with Resilio's synchronization and caching capabilities to enable high-speed access to shared files across offices, remote sites, and hybrid work environments without reliance on VPN-based access or proprietary hardware infrastructure.

Nasuni positioned the acquisition as a strategic step toward broader data orchestration capabilities, particularly for enterprise AI and analytics initiatives. Following completion of the acquisition, both companies announced a phased integration of teams, technology, and operations, while committing to continuity of service and support for existing Resilio customers and partners.
