= Tron (blockchain) =

Blockchain computing platform

TRON
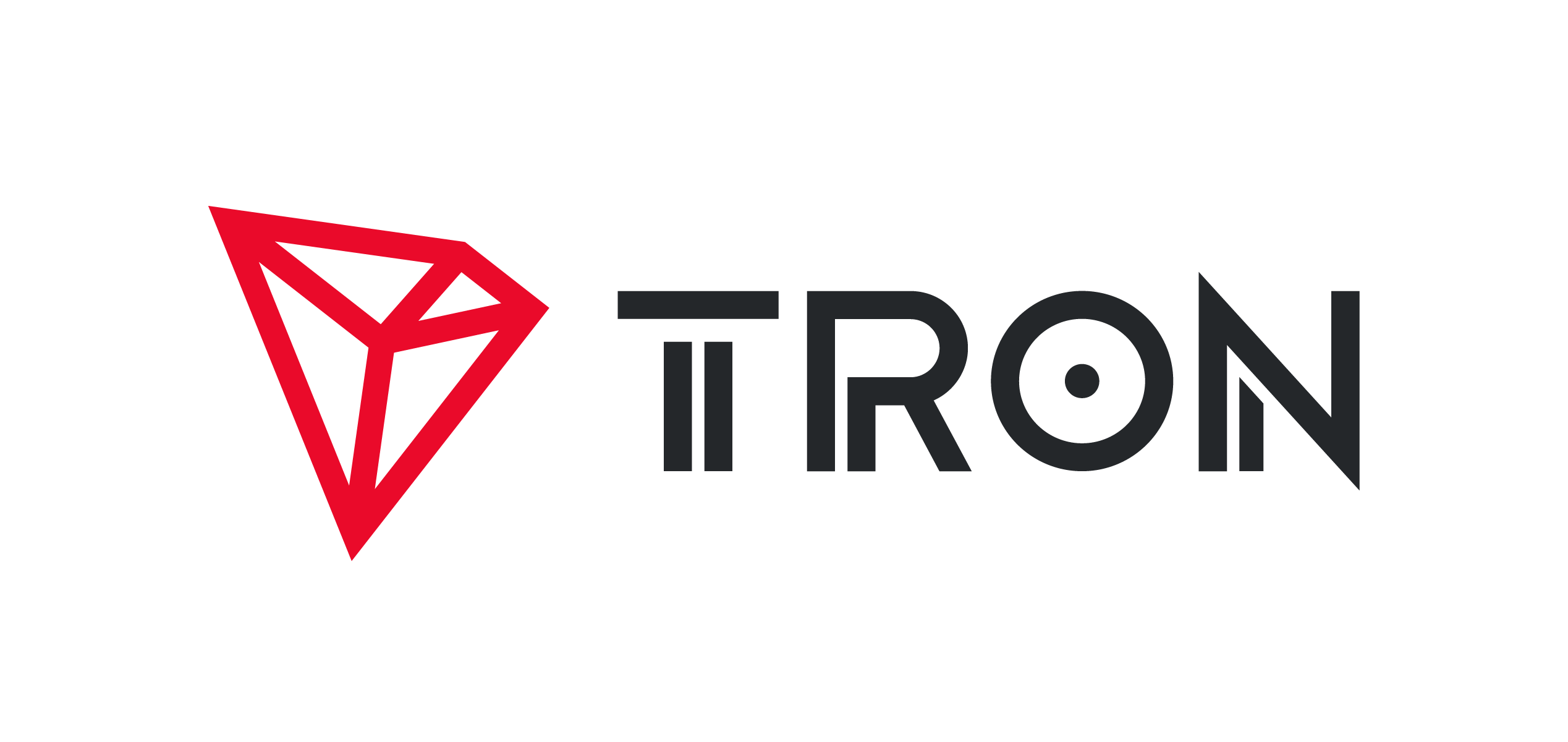
- Original author(s): Justin Sun
- Developer(s): TRON-Foundation Ltd.
- Initial release: 25 July 2018; 8 years ago
- Development status: Active
- Written in: Java
- Platform: Tron
- Available in: Multilingual, but primarily English
- Type: Distributed computing
- License: GNU Lesser General Public License
- Website: tron.network

Tron (stylized in all caps) is a decentralized, proof-of-stake blockchain with smart contract functionality. The cryptocurrency native to the blockchain is known as Tronix (TRX). It was founded in March 2014 by Justin Sun and, since 2017, has been overseen and supervised by the TRON Foundation, a non-profit organization in Singapore, established in the same year. It is open-source software.

Tron was originally an Ethereum-based ERC-20 token, which switched protocol to its own blockchain in 2018.

Tron has been criticised for enabling organized crime, with The Wall Street Journal stating in 2025 that it is a "popular channel for crypto’s criminal fraternity to move funds" and responsible for "more than half of all illegal crypto activity" in 2024, with the United Nations Office on Drugs and Crime calling it a “preferred choice for crypto money launderers” in Asia.

== History ==
Tron was founded by Justin Sun in 2017. The TRON Foundation was established in July 2017 in Singapore. The TRON Foundation raised $70 million in 2017 through an initial coin offering (ICO) shortly before China outlawed the digital tokens. The testnet, Blockchain Explorer, and Web Wallet were all launched by March 2018. TRON Mainnet launched shortly afterward in May 2018, marking the Odyssey 2.0 release as a technical milestone for TRON.

In June 2018, TRON switched its protocol from an ERC-20 token on top of Ethereum to an independent peer-to-peer network. On 25 July 2018, the TRON Foundation announced it had finished the acquisition of BitTorrent, a peer-to-peer file sharing service. Upon this acquisition, in August 2018, BitTorrent Founder Bram Cohen also disclosed that he was leaving the company to found a separate cryptocurrency, Chia.

By January 2019, TRON had a total market cap of about $1.6 bn. Despite this market performance, some authors viewed TRON as a typical case of the complex and disordered nature of cryptocurrencies. In February 2019, after being acquired by TRON Foundation, BitTorrent started its own token sale based on the TRON network.

In late 2021, Justin Sun resigned as CEO of the TRON Foundation, which was subsequently reorganized as a DAO.

In March 2023, Sun and Tron were sued by the U.S. Securities and Exchange Commission (SEC) for selling unregistered securities related to the sale and promotion of Tronix (TRX) and BitTorrent (BBT) tokens; the SEC alleged that Sun and Tron had engaged in wash trading in the secondary market for TRX in order to buoy its price. $31 million of proceeds were generated through thousands of Tronix trades between two accounts Sun controlled. Eight celebrities, including Akon, Ne-Yo, Austin Mahone, Soulja Boy, Lindsay Lohan, Jake Paul and Lil Yachty, were charged with promoting these cryptocurrencies without disclosing that they were sponsored, with all those other than Soulja Boy, and Mahone settling with the FTC for more than $400,000, without admitting or denying the charges.

In Febaruary 2024, Circle announced it would stop supporting USDC token on the Tron network.

In September 2024, TRON, Tether, and TRM Labs announced the T3 Financial Crime Unit (T3 FCU), an initiative aimed at addressing illicit activities involving the use of USDT on the TRON blockchain.

== Architecture ==
TRON adopts a 3-layer architecture divided into storage layer, core layer, and application layer. The TRON protocol adheres to Google protocol buffers, which intrinsically supports multi-language extension.

The TRON protocol, maintained primarily by the TRON Foundation, distributes computing resources equally among TRX holders with internal pricing mechanisms such as bandwidth and energy. TRON provides a decentralized virtual machine, which can execute a program using an international network of public nodes. The network has zero transaction fees and conducts approximately 2,000 transactions per second.

The implementations of TRON require minimal transaction fees in order to prevent malicious users from performing DDoS attacks for free. In this respect, EOS.IO and TRON are quite similar, due to the negligible fees, high transactions per second, and high reliability, and as such are regarded as a new generation of blockchain systems. Michael Borkowski, Marten Sigwart, Philipp Frauenthaler, Taneli Hukkinen and Stefan Schulte defined TRON as an Ethereum clone, with no fundamental differences. The transactions per second rate on Tron's blockchain was questioned because it was far below its theoretical claim.

== Criticism and enabling of organized crime ==
In January 2018, via a Tweet, Juan Benet, the CEO at Protocol Labs, revealed that the white paper of TRON copied portions of the white papers from IPFSbot and MineFilecoin, without a single reference. Researchers from Digital Asset Research (DAR) discovered multiple instances of code copied from other projects in the Tron code base. It is also accused of violating the GNU Lesser General Public License v3.0 (LGPL) because the project does not mention that its client was derived from EthereumJ, a Java implementation of Ethereum. These accusations were denied by the TRON Foundation, the organization behind the design of the system.

In May 2019, a report submitted through the bug bounty platform HackerOne revealed that just one computer could have brought TRON's entire blockchain to a halt. The revelation showed that a barrage of requests sent by a single PC could be used to squeeze the power of the blockchain's CPU, overload the memory, and perform a distributed denial-of-service (DDoS) attack.

In November 2023, the TRON network was used by various terrorist organizations, including Hamas, Hezbollah, and Palestinian Islamic Jihad. The TRON DAO released a statement emphasizing their support for the UN's stance against malicious actors in the blockchain space, but disputing the claim that TRON, Ethereum or similar decentralized protocols may exercise direct control over those who leverage this open-source technology.

According to a 2025 article in The Wall Street Journal, it was stated that "more than half of all illegal crypto activity—some $26 billion" passed through the TRON network, with the WSJ describing it as a "popular channel for crypto’s criminal fraternity to move funds". The United Nations Office on Drugs and Crime described the TRON network in 2024 as a "preferred choice for crypto money launderers" in the Asian region.
