= Ross Cohen =

American computer programmer

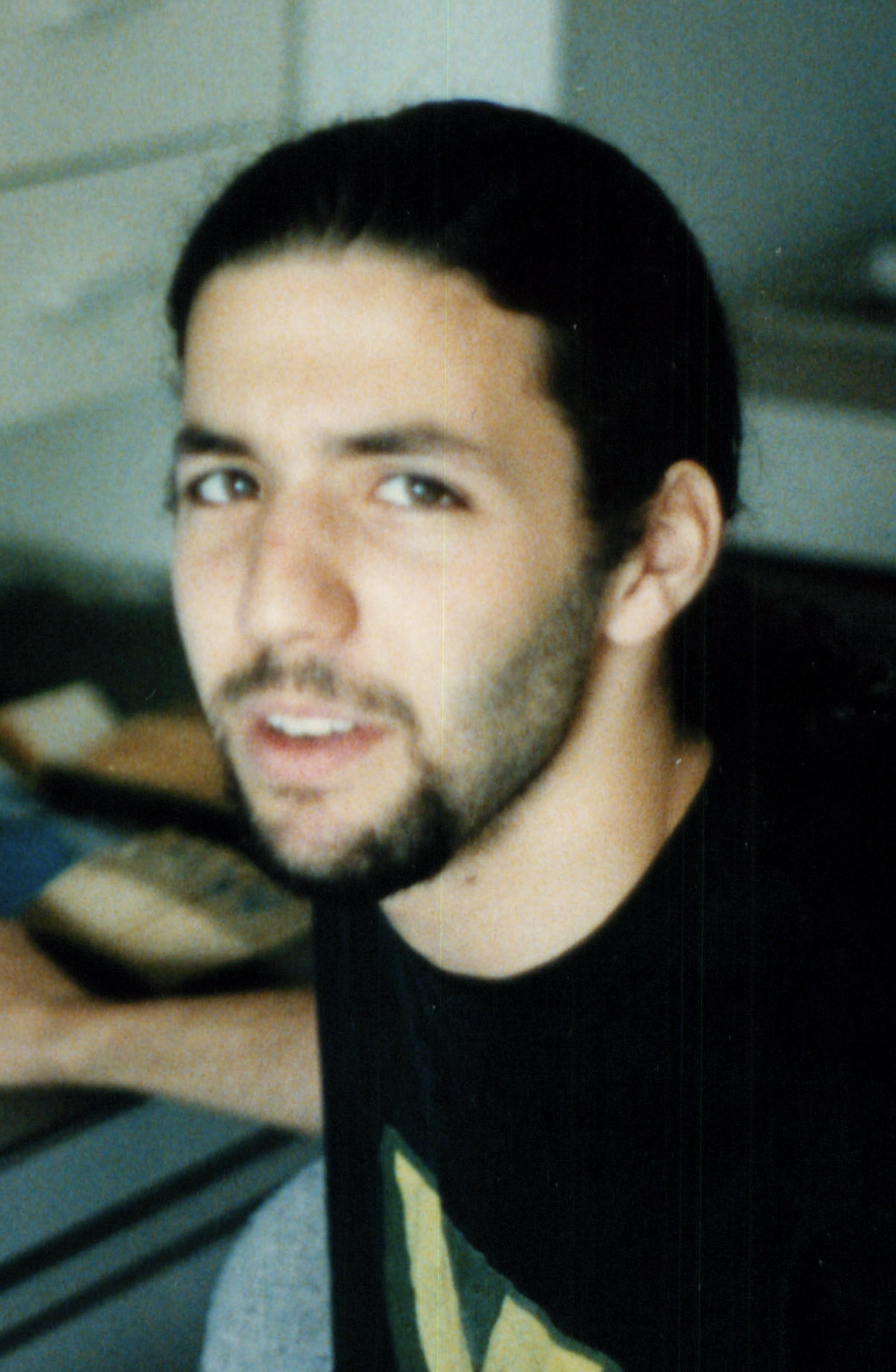
Ross Cohen at CMU

Ross Cohen is the cofounder of BitTorrent Inc. He started the company in 2004 along with his brother Bram Cohen, where among other things he was involved in the Codeville project. He attended Carnegie Mellon University and Stuyvesant High School. He was forced out of the company in 2006.
