= Resilio Sync =

File synchronization software

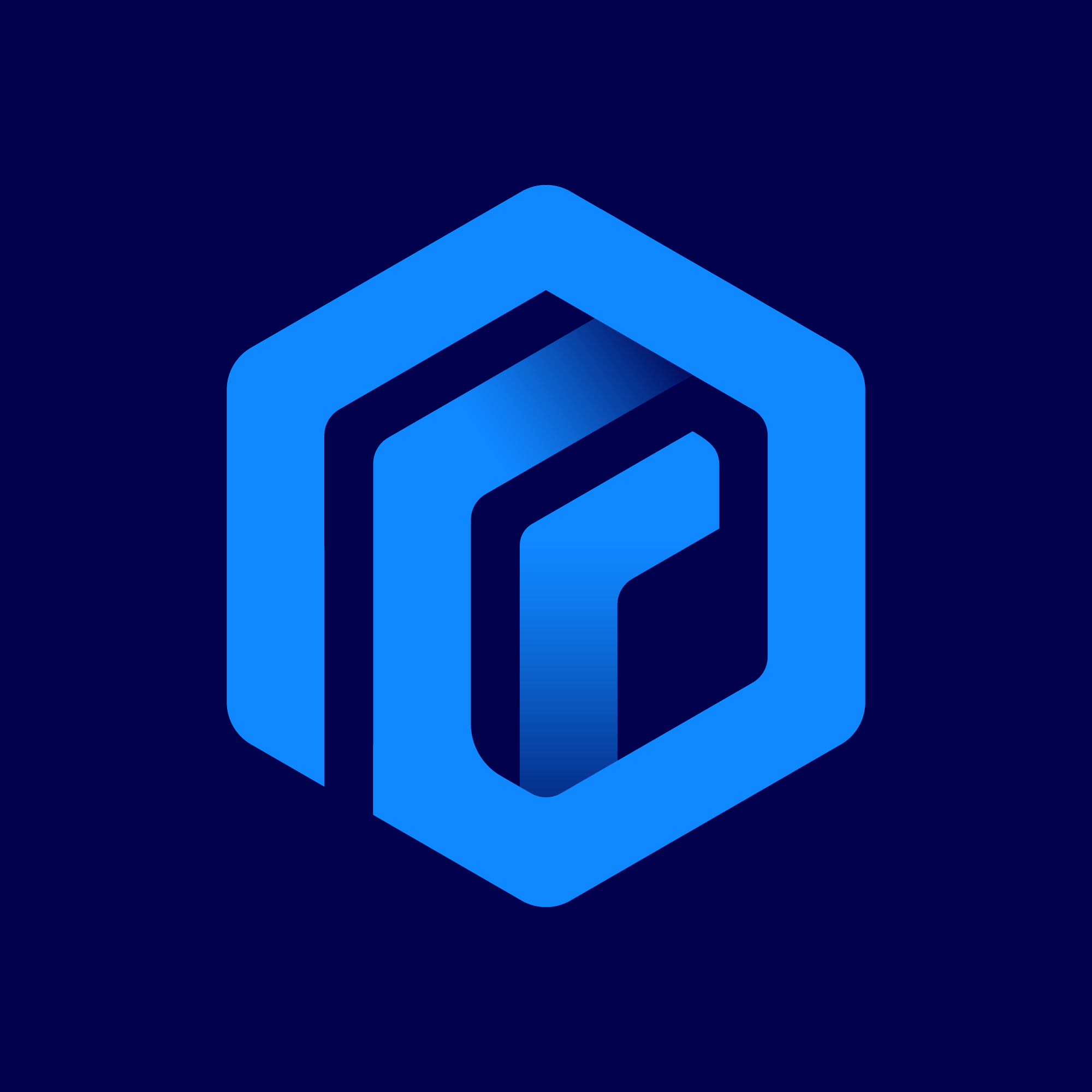
- Resilio Sync 2025
- Original author: Konstantin Lissounov
- Developer: Resilio, Inc.
- Stable release: 3.1.2.1076 / 31 October 2025; 4 months ago
- Operating system: Windows NT, macOS, Linux, FreeBSD, Android, iOS, iPadOS, Windows Phone, Fire OS
- Available in: 13 languages
- List of languages English, German, French, Spanish, Italian, Japanese, Korean, Portuguese, Brazilian Portuguese, Russian, Chinese, Turkish, Dutch, Indonesian
- Type: File Synchronization
- License: Freemium
- Website: www.resilio.com

Resilio Sync (formerly BitTorrent Sync) by Resilio, Inc. is a proprietary peer-to-peer file synchronization tool available for Windows, Mac, Linux, Android, iOS, iPadOS, Windows Phone, Amazon Kindle Fire and BSD. It can sync files between devices on a local network, or between remote devices over the Internet via a modified version of the BitTorrent protocol.

Although not touted by the developers as an intended direct replacement nor competitor to cloud-based file synchronization services, it has attained much of its publicity in this potential role.

== History ==
On 24 January 2013, BitTorrent, Inc. announced a call for pre-alpha testers to help test a new "distributed syncing product to help manage personal files between multiple computers".

Several private pre-alpha builds of "SyncApp" were subsequently made available to a limited group of alpha testers between January 2013 and April 2013. In mid-April 2013, the name "SyncApp" was dropped in favor of "BitTorrent Sync".

On 23 April 2013, the previously private "alpha" was opened up to general users.

As of 6 May 2013, more than a petabyte of anonymous data had been synced between users, with over 70 terabytes synced daily.

As of 16 July 2013, more than eight petabytes of data had been synced using the software.

On 17 July 2013, BitTorrent Sync migrated from "alpha" to "beta", released an Android app, and introduced versioning.

On 27 August 2013, BitTorrent Sync for iOS was announced.

On 5 November 2013, BitTorrent announced the release of BitTorrent Sync Beta API and version 1.2 of the client, along with the milestone, having over 1 million monthly active users synced over 30 petabytes of data to date.

As of 26 August 2014, there have been more than 10 million user installs and more than 80 petabytes of data synced between users.

On 3 March 2015, the product finally exited beta as a commercial product, with the inclusion of a paid Pro version.

On 9 September 2015, with the release of Sync 2.2, in the free version, the 10 folder limit that had been introduced in 2.0 was removed.

On 21 January 2016, the release of Sync 2.3 introduced the Encrypted Folder, as well as the ability to run as a Windows Service, to use SD cards on Android and, for paid users, Selective Sync support in Linux.

On 1 June 2016, product and team were spun out of BitTorrent Inc. as an independent company, Resilio Inc. which will continue development of the product under the name Resilio Sync. Former Bittorrent CEO Eric Klinker became the head of the new company.

On 7 Aug 2024, with the release of Sync 3.0, features previously available only to paid Pro plans became available to all non-commercial users with registration. The Resilio Sync Business product was deprecated in favor of Resilio Active Everywhere, and upgrades of the Resilio Sync Business client to version 3.0 were not available for business customers.

== Technology ==
Resilio Sync synchronizes files using BitTorrent. The user's data is stored on the user's local device instead of in a "cloud", therefore requiring at least two user devices, or "nodes," to be online to synchronize files between them. Resilio Sync encrypts data with an Advanced Encryption Standard AES-128 key in counter mode which may either be randomly generated or set by the user. This key is derived from a "secret" which can be shared to other users to share data. Data is sent between devices directly unless the target device is unreachable (e.g. behind a firewall), in which case the data will first be relayed via an intermediary node. Many devices can be connected simultaneously and files shared between them in a mesh networking topology.

There is no limit on the amount of data that can be synced, other than the available free space on each device.

== Compatibility ==
Current builds of Resilio Sync are available for the following operating systems:

- Microsoft Windows (Windows 7 or later 32 bit and 64 bit)
- OS X (10.8 or later)
- Linux (web interface, also GUI available for Debian derived systems)
- FreeBSD
- NAS Devices
- Android
- Amazon Kindle
- iOS
- Windows Phone

== See also ==
- Syncthing – Free and open-source peer-to-peer file synchronization application
- Comparison of file synchronization software
