= BitTorrent Open Source License =

The BitTorrent Open Source License, is derived from the Jabber Open Source License, which is an Open Source Initiative (OSI) approved license. Former versions of the BitTorrent client (before 6.0) and related pieces of software are licensed under this License.

A noteworthy aspect of the BitTorrent Open Source License is that it does not grant trademark license. The trademark "BitTorrent" is owned by the company BitTorrent Inc. and is governed by the Trademark Use Guidelines.

== Open Source claims ==
Although the license is derived from an OSI-approved license, this license hasn't been approved. Furthermore, the approved version of the Jabber licence is no longer used or recommended for use by its authors.

The Free Software Foundation considers it to be a free software license, albeit one incompatible with the GNU General Public License.
