= Sophia A. Nelson =

American author and journalist

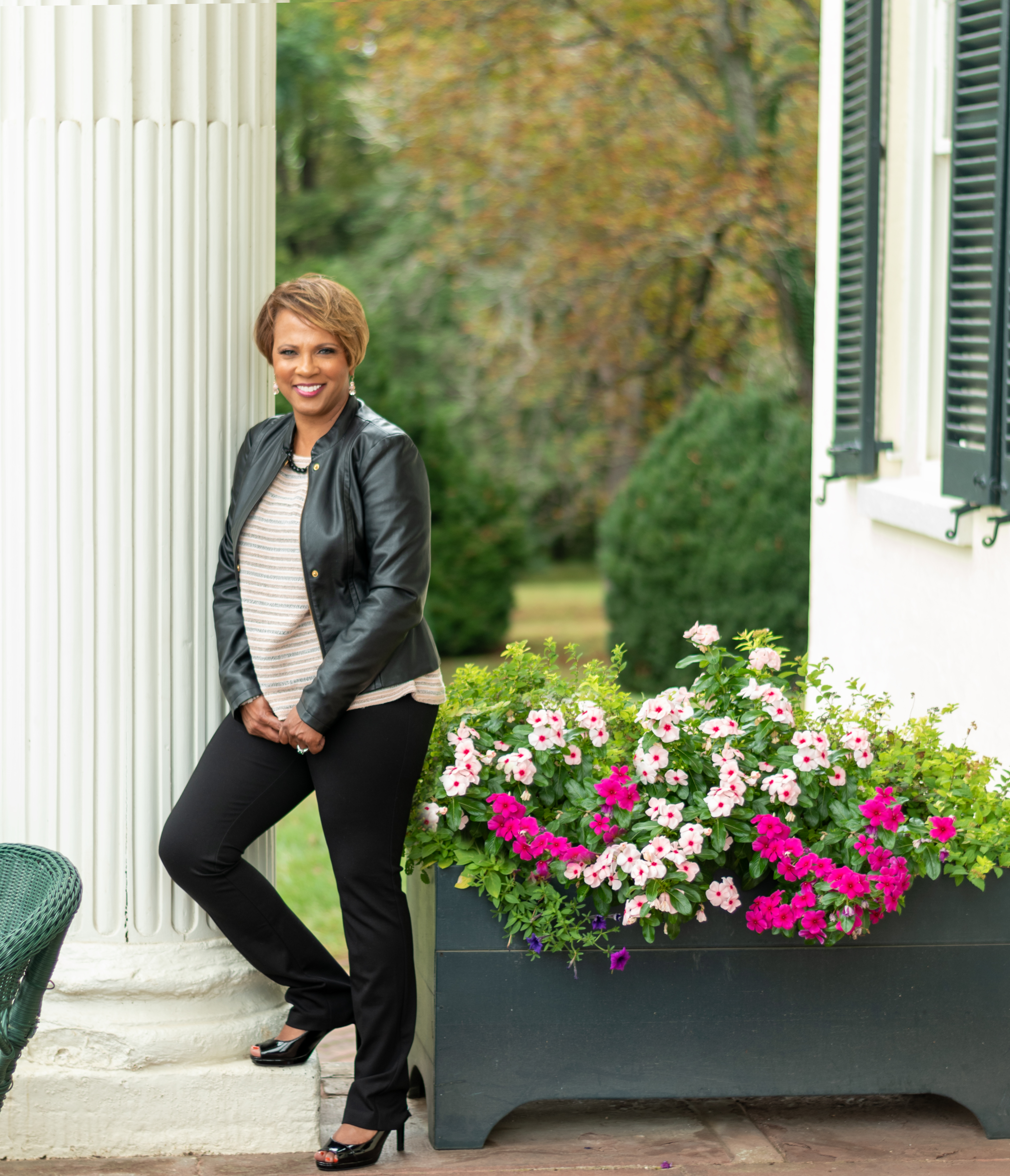
- Sophia A. Nelson in 2019
- Born: Sophia Angeli Nelson; January 5, 1967 (age 59); Munich, West Germany
- Education: San Diego State University (BA); American University (JD)
- Occupations: Lawyer, author, political commentator
- Political party: Independent (2020–present)
- Other political affiliations: Republican (until 2020)
- Website: Official website

Sophia Angeli Nelson (born January 5, 1967) is an American author and journalist.

== Education and early career ==
She was born in Munich, Germany, and grew up in Somerdale, New Jersey, graduating from Sterling High School in 1985. She received her B.A. in economics and political science from San Diego State University, and became politically active as a Republican in 1988 after hearing Jack Kemp during the 1988 presidential primaries. She was legal counsel to New Jersey Governor Christine Todd Whitman and ran for Congress in New Jersey's 1st congressional district in 1996. She was also a GOP counsel for the House Government Reform and Oversight Committee, but ultimately decided to become a journalist and author. As of 2020, she is a political independent. She is a member of Alpha Kappa Alpha sorority.

== Works ==
- Black Woman Redefined : Dispelling Myths and Discovering Fulfillment in the Age of Michelle Obama, Dallas, Tex. : BenBella Books, 2012. ISBN 9781936661732
- E Pluribus One : Reclaiming our Founders' Vision for a United America, New York : Center Street, 2017. ISBN 9781455569397
