= HTX (cryptocurrency exchange) =

Digital currency trading platform

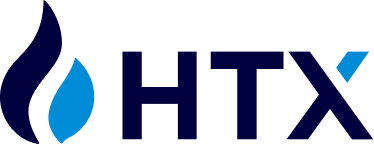
- Native name: 火币
- Type: Public
- Industry: Cryptocurrency exchange
- Founded: 2013; 13 years ago
- Founder: Leon Li
- Headquarters: Seychelles
- Key people: Leon Li (Chairman, Founder) Jiawei Zhu (COO); Xianfeng Cheng (CTO); Charlie Tsai (CSO); Xiaofeng Chen (Vice President) Peng Hu (Vice President)
- Owner: Justin Sun
- Website: htx.com

HTX, formerly known as Huobi, is a Seychelles-based cryptocurrency exchange. Founded in China, (Chinese: 火币网; pinyin: Huǒbìwǎng), HTX now has offices in Hong Kong, South Korea, Japan and the United States. In August 2018, it became a publicly listed Hong Kong company. According to Bloomberg, it is owned by cryptocurrency billionaire Justin Sun.

Following a 2017 ban on Bitcoin exchanges by the Chinese government, Huobi stopped Bitcoin withdrawals.

As of March 2018, Huobi processed around US $1 billion in trades daily.

Huobi changed its name to HTX in September 2023. In 2026, HTX was sanctioned by the UK government and the European Union.

== History ==
Huobi was founded in 2013 by Leon Li (Chinese: 李林; pinyin: Lǐ Lín). An alumnus of Tsinghua University, Li was a computer engineer at Oracle before founding Huobi.

On May 15, 2013, the Huobi Group (火币集团) acquired the huobi.com domain. On August 1, Huobi launched a simulation trading platform, and on September 1 the Bitcoin trading platform launched.

In November 2013, Huobi received angel investments from Dai Zhikang and Zhen Fund. In 2014, Huobi raised a $10 million venture capital investment from Sequoia Capital. In August 2014, Huobi acquired Bitcoin wallet provider Quick Wallet.

In December 2013, trading volume exceeded 30 billion yuan, making Huobi China's largest digital asset trading platform at the time. In June 2016, its total transaction volume reached 1 trillion RMB, and in November 2016 1.7 trillion yuan, accounting for more than 60% of the global bitcoin exchange market. On December 22, 2016, its daily transaction volume surpassed 200 billion yuan.

In September 2014, Huobi announced through its official Weibo account that 920 bitcoin and 8,100 litecoin had been wrongly deposited into 27 different accounts. The firm returned the lost cryptocurrency.

In August 2017 Huobi and OKCoin controversially invested 1 billion yuan ($150 million) of idle client funds into wealth-management products.

In September 2017, the Chinese government banned initial coin offerings (ICOs) and trading on domestic cryptocurrency exchanges, rendering many people's holdings effectively worthless, including those of users on Huobi's exchange. In response, Huobi adjusted its business and organizational structure to promote global expansion. In October 2017, Huobi officially expanded into Korea with a new headquarters in Seoul, South Korea, and opened trading in March 2018.

In November 2017, it launched operations in Singapore with total volume in the first month exceeding 30 billion RMB. In December 2017, it launched an office in Tokyo, Japan and announced that it would set up two crypto exchanges in Japan in early 2018, through a partnership with Japanese financial group SBI Group. In March 2018, Huobi announced that it will be launching in the United States.

In August 2018, in a reverse takeover, Huobi acquired a 74% stake in Hong Kong electronics manufacturer Pantronics Holdings, becoming listed on the Hong Kong Stock Exchange.

== Legal status ==
In November 2020, Huobi launches Huobi Labuan to realize regulated crypto exchange in Malaysia. In September 2021, Huobi announced that it would stop serving customers in mainland China due to new regulations. According to Bloomberg News, In 2022, Huobi was purchased by cryptocurrency billionaire Justin Sun. In September 2023, Huobi announced its rebranding as HTX.

=== Sanctions ===
In May 2026, the UK government sanctioned HTX for alleged violations of international sanctions against Russia. In July 2026, the European Union sanctioned HTX as part of a sanctions package on Russia for its invasion of Ukraine. HTX was reported to have responded to sanctions by making its transactions more difficult to track.
