= Megan Squire =

American computer scientist studying online extremism

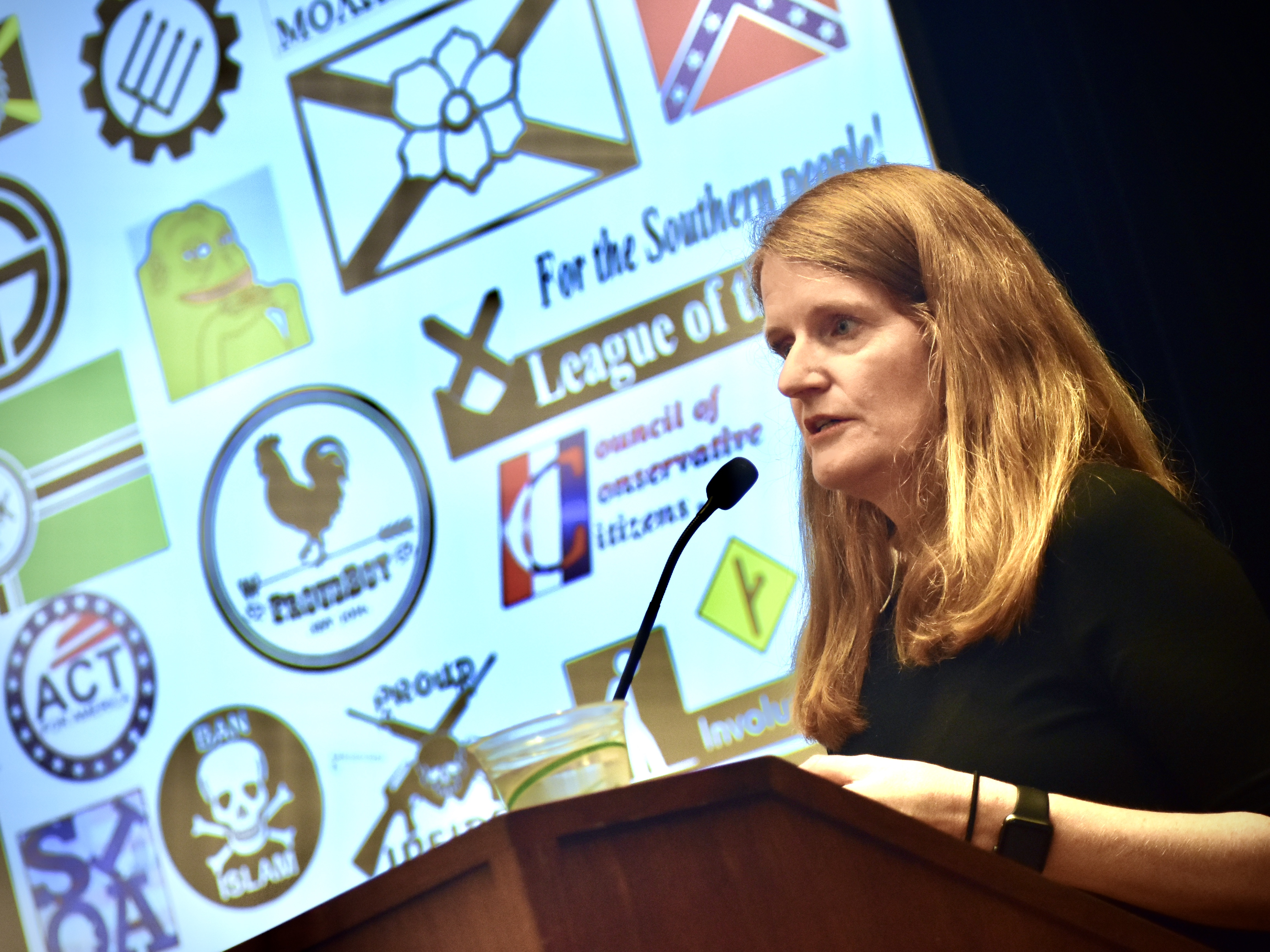
- Squire in 2017
- Board member of: Center for Analysis of the Radical Right (CARR)

Academic background
- Education: College of William & Mary; Nova Southeastern University

Academic work
- Discipline: Data science, cybersecurity, online extremism
- Website: www.megansquire.com

Megan Squire is a data science researcher and expert in cybersecurity and political extremism. She currently works for a company that makes IT security software; previously she was the deputy director for data analytics and open source intelligence at the Southern Poverty Law Center. Earlier in her career, she was a professor of computer science at Elon University and an Anti-Defamation League fellow with a focus on right-wing political extremism online. Her work has been described as operating as an intermediary between non-profits like the Southern Poverty Law Center and militant groups on the far-left.

== Education and early career ==
Squire grew up in a conservative Christian household near Virginia Beach, Virginia. She attended the College of William & Mary, where she earned a double major in art history and public policy. She took a secretarial job at an antivirus software company after becoming interested in computers. After receiving her PhD from Nova Southeastern University in Florida, she worked at a startup in North Carolina and then began teaching at Elon University.

== Research ==
Squire's research focuses on how online extremism is mediated by social media networks, including Telegram, Facebook, and other platforms.

Squire performed research in 2018 on anti-Muslim Facebook groups, using Facebook's Graph API to create a dataset of 700,000 members from 1,870 open and closed groups with ideologies including anti-Muslim, white nationalist, neo-Confederate, and more. The data was gathered over ten months. She found that membership in one such group correlated highly with the chance of being in another group, indicating that anti-Muslim sentiment acted as a "common denominator" for membership in related groups. Her research has been cited in lawsuits against Facebook for failing to remove such groups.

She has also explored how the younger generation of far right extremists, including Nick Fuentes and Patrick Casey, use video livestreaming and gaming platforms to earn money. A study in November 2020 showed that a handful of leaders of the global white nationalist movement are raising significant sums of money. As of November 2020, Squires' research indicated that Fuentes was earning about $326 per day off of DLive, or about $119,000 per year. "Most donations are small amounts of money, but some donors give very, very large amounts... Some users are giving $10,000 to $20,000 a month to streamers on Dlive." Her research using information gleaned from the public APIs of Venmo and Facebook showed that the Proud Boys were taking dues despite claims to the contrary.

In 2024, Squire led an SPLC research project that claimed that the social media and messaging app Telegram was prone to suggesting particularly dangerous and extremist content to users. The center's report, titled "Telegram’s Toxic Recommendations," examined thousands of content channels on the app and alleges that even searches for innocuous topics connected users to channels devoted to conspiracy theories and racist ideologies.

Squire is also the author of two books: Clean Data - Data Science Strategies for Tackling Dirty Data, and Mastering Data Mining with Python - Find Patterns Hidden in Your Data.

== Activism ==
Squire first engaged in activism at age 15, when she joined her school environmental club to protest pollution at an industrial cattle farm. While teaching at Elon, she protested the war in Iraq. In 2008, Squire campaigned for the future US President Obama; however, following Obama's handling of the Great Recession, Squire became disillusioned with electoral politics and began engaging with the Occupy movement.

Though she doesn't consider herself to be part of the Antifa movement, they have been said to be among her "strongest allies" and she is "unwilling" to condemn the use of political violence.

In August 2017, Squire documented concrete evidence from social media of white supremacist supporters planning to attend the Unite the Right rally in Charlottesville, Virginia. She attended a counterprotest that clashed violently with the far-right groups.

Amid a rise in fascist and neo-Nazi pamphleting of college campuses, Squire put together an interactive map of such events. By 14 November 2017, she had documented over 200 such occurrences.

In 2020, at an anti-racism protest outside the Alamance County Courthouse in downtown Graham, Squire was assaulted by two members of a pro-Confederate monument group described by the Southern Poverty Law Center as a hate group. Both assailants were arrested and charged, one charged for assault on a female and the other for disorderly conduct.

== Honors and recognitions ==
In 2019, her presentation "Understanding Gray Networks Using Social Media Trace Data" was named runner-up for Best Paper at the International Conference on Social Informatics. In 2022, Squire was named a Belfer Fellow by the Anti-Defamation League for her work to "collect, analyze, and visualize quantitative data from social media platforms to understand the impact of various types and levels of deplatforming and demonetization on far-right individuals and groups." She was a Fellow at the Southern Poverty Law Center before taking a role as the organization's Deputy Director for Data Analytics and Open-Source Intelligence.
