= Sterling High School (New Jersey) =

Public high school and school district in Camden County, New Jersey, US

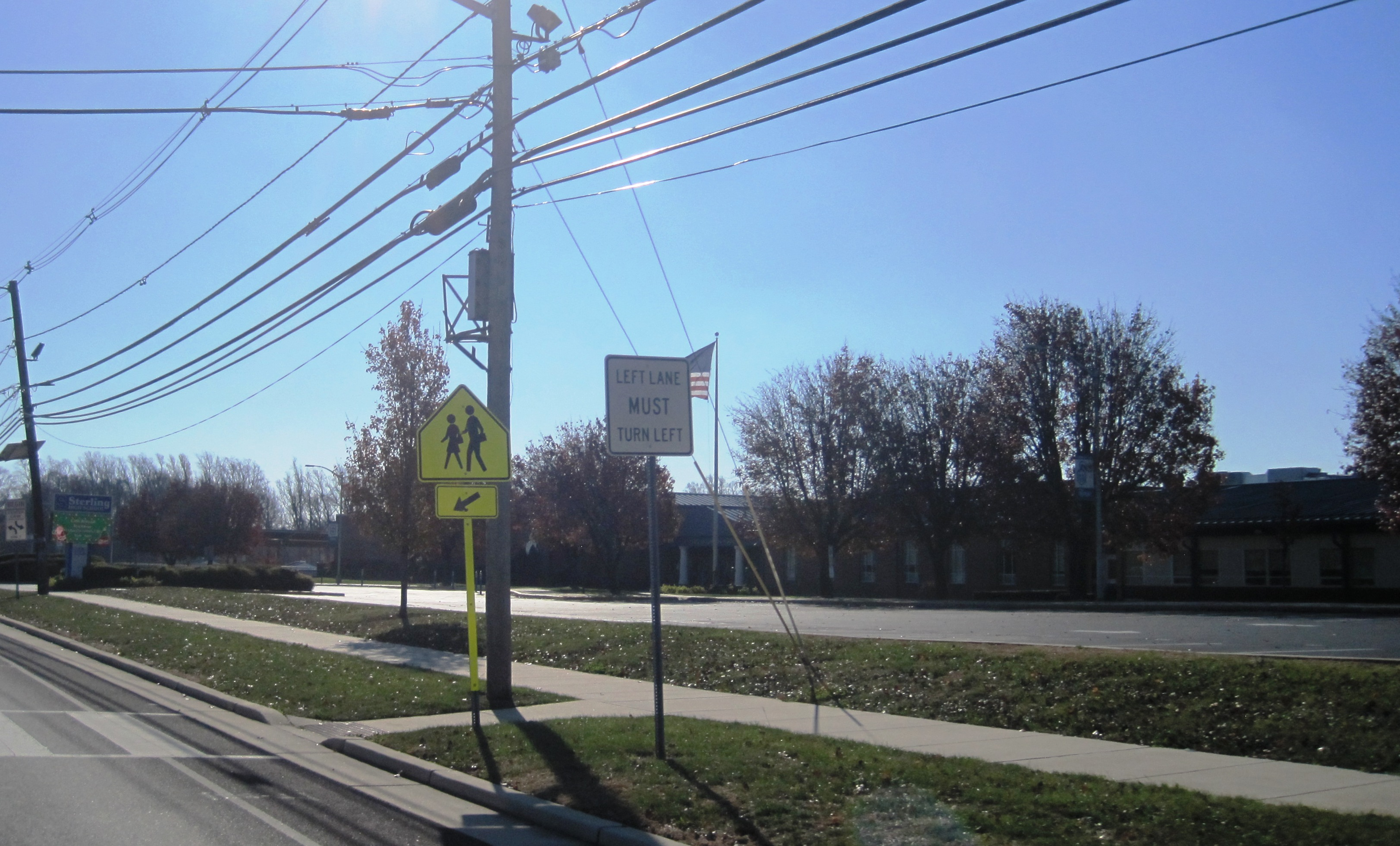
- Front of the school

Address
- 501 South Warwick Road Somerdale, Camden County, 08083; United States
- Coordinates: 39.836231°N 75.024645°W

District information
- Grades: 9-12
- Superintendent: Matthew Sheehan
- Business administrator: Jim McCullough
- Schools: 1

Students and staff
- Enrollment: 839 (as of 2024–25)
- Faculty: 71.4 FTEs
- Student–teacher ratio: 11.8:1

Other information
- District Factor Group: CD
- Website: www.sterling.k12.nj.us
Ind.	Per pupil	District spending	Rank (*)	9–12 average	%± vs. average
1A	Total Spending	$18,922	11	$18,891	0.2%
1	Budgetary Cost	15,390	19	15,592	−1.3%
2	Classroom Instruction	8,613	19	8,807	−2.2%
6	Support Services	2,085	16	2,294	−9.1%
8	Administrative Cost	1,479	14	1,592	−7.1%
10	Operations & Maintenance	2,108	29	1,954	7.9%
13	Extracurricular Activities	1,107	37	873	26.8%
16	Median Teacher Salary	62,100	11	71,726
Data from NJDoE 2014 Taxpayers' Guide to Education Spending. *Of 9–12 districts with any number of students. Lowest spending=1; Highest=47

Sterling High School

Information
- Type: Public high school
- Established: September 1960
- NCES School ID: 340288001662
- Principal: Jarod Claybourn
- Faculty: 71.4 FTEs
- Enrollment: 839 (as of 2024–25)
- Student to teacher ratio: 11.8:1
- Colors: Royal blue silver and white
- Athletics conference: Colonial Conference (general); West Jersey Football League (football)
- Team name: Silver Knights
- Newspaper: The Accolade
- Yearbook: Silver Scroll

Sterling High School is a comprehensive regional public high school and school district serving students in ninth through twelfth grades from five communities in Camden County, in the U.S. state of New Jersey. The district serves students from Magnolia, Somerdale, Stratford, along with students from Hi-Nella and Laurel Springs who attend as part of sending/receiving relationships. The school is located in Somerdale and is the only facility of the Sterling High School District.

Sterling High School has been approved by the New Jersey Department of Education (2000) and has been accredited by the Middle States Association of Colleges and Schools Commission on Elementary and Secondary Schools since 1964 and was granted probationary accreditation by Middle States in 2012.

As of the 2024–25 school year, the school had an enrollment of 839 students and 71.4 classroom teachers (on an FTE basis), for a student–teacher ratio of 11.8:1. There were 269 students (32.1% of enrollment) eligible for free lunch and 55 (6.6% of students) eligible for reduced-cost lunch.

== History ==
Ground was broken for the school in July 1959, with costs estimated at $950,000 (equivalent to $10.5 million in 2025) for construction of a facility designed to accommodate an enrollment of 800 students.

Opened in September 1960 as Sterling Regional High School, the new facility served students who had previously attended Haddon Heights High School.

The district had been classified by the New Jersey Department of Education as being in District Factor Group "CD", the third-lowest of eight groupings. District Factor Groups organize districts statewide to allow comparison by common socioeconomic characteristics of the local districts. From lowest socioeconomic status to highest, the categories are A, B, CD, DE, FG, GH, I and J.

== Awards, recognition and honors ==
The school was the 234th-ranked public high school in New Jersey out of 339 schools statewide in New Jersey Monthly magazine's September 2014 cover story on the state's "Top Public High Schools", using a new ranking methodology. The school had been ranked 266th in the state of 328 schools in 2012, after being ranked 231st in 2010 out of 322 schools listed. The magazine ranked the school 225th in 2008 out of 316 schools. The school was ranked 228th in the magazine's September 2006 issue, which surveyed 316 schools across the state. Schooldigger.com ranked the school 240th out of 367 public high schools statewide in its 2009–10 rankings which were based on the combined percentage of students classified as proficient or above proficient on the language arts literacy and mathematics components of the High School Proficiency Assessment (HSPA).

== Curriculum ==
Advanced Placement (AP) courses are offered in AP English Literature, AP United States History, AP Calculus, and AP Biology. Honors courses are offered in Algebra I, Geometry, Pre Calculus, Spanish V, Calculus, and Physics. High School Plus credit with Camden County College is offered in History, Spanish, French, Biology, Software Systems, Latin, and World Civilizations. A variety of languages are offered including: Spanish, Latin, French, and Italian II.

== Athletics ==
The Sterling High School Silver Knights compete as a member school in the Colonial Conference, which is comprised of small schools whose enrollments generally do not exceed between 750 and 800 students for grades 9–12 and operates under the auspices of the New Jersey State Interscholastic Athletic Association (NJSIAA). With 658 students in grades 10–12, the school was classified by the NJSIAA for the 2022–24 school years as Group II South for most athletic competition purposes. The football team competes in the Constitution Division of the 94-team West Jersey Football League superconference and was classified by the NJSIAA as Group II South for football for 2024–2026, which included schools with 514 to 685 students.

The football team won the NJSIAA South Jersey Group III state sectional championships in 1974, 1976 and 1977. In 1974, Sterling won the first ever South Jersey Group III football championship determined by playoffs, defeating Woodrow Wilson High School by a score of 15–12 in a game played at the Atlantic City Convention Center. The 1976 team won the South Jersey Group III sectional title with a 28–13 win against a Deptford Township High School team that came into the championship game undefeated.

The boys' soccer team was the Group III co-champion in 1976, after a tie with Summit High School in the final game of the tournament. They would win their first outright championship in 2024 after defeating Harrison 3-2 in double overtime in the Group II final.

The softball team won the Group II state championship in 1981 (defeating Jefferson Township High School in the tournament's final game) and 2008 (vs. Kittatinny Regional High School). The 1981 team finished the season with an 18–5 record after winning the Group II title at Mercer County Park with a 7–6 victory against Jefferson Township on two runs scored in the bottom of the seventh inning. In 2008, the team won the New Jersey Group II state championship with a 1–0 win against Kittatinny Regional High School. The softball team won the South, Group II state sectional championship in 2007 with a 9–4 win over Haddon Township High School.

The girls' basketball team won with Group II state championships in 1989 (against runner-up Glen Rock High School in the finals), 1990 (vs. Boonton High School), 2000 (vs. West Morris Mendham High School) and 2001 (vs. Hanover Park High School) The team won the Group II title in 1990 with a 60–53 win against a Boonton team that hadn't lost all season until the championship game. The Lady Knights basketball squad is one of only two South Jersey teams to win the NJSIAA Tournament of Champions, winning it in 2001 by a score of 48–40 over Columbia High School. The other is Woodrow Wilson High School, who accomplished the feat in 2005.

Sterling's wrestling program won back-to-back South Jersey Group II state titles in 1999 and 2000. Mark Manchio won three consecutive state wrestling titles in 1999, 2000 and 2001 (125–2 career record). In 2002, Ivan Wiggins won the state wrestling title at 112 lbs.

The baseball team won the South Jersey Group II title in 2007 with a win over Gateway Regional High School. In 2002 and 2003 the baseball team won back to back Diamond Classic tournaments.

In 2004, Donald "Sonnie" Pollosco won the South Jersey Coach's Invitational State Title and Camden County Singles title. (112–6 career record)

In 2013, the Sterling Lady Knights volleyball team won the Group II state championship, the program's first, defeating Madison High School in the tournament final.

In 2013, Jimmy Daniels won the Group II State Championship in the Indoor 3200m Run.

In 2014, the Sterling Lady Knights soccer team won the South Jersey Group II state sectional championship, the program's first, defeating Point Pleasant Borough High School in the tournament final by a score of 3–2.

== Administration ==
Core members of the school's administration include:

- Matthew Sheehan, superintendent
- Jim McCullough, business administrator and board secretary
- Jarod Claybourn, principal (assisted by two vice principals)

== Board of education ==
The district's board of education, comprised of nine members, sets policy and oversees the fiscal and educational operation of the district through its administration. As a Type II school district, the board's trustees are elected directly by voters to serve three-year terms of office on a staggered basis, with three seats up for election each year held (since 2012) as part of the November general election. The board appoints a superintendent to oversee the district's day-to-day operations and a business administrator to supervise the business functions of the district.

Seats on the district's board of education are allocated based on the population of the constituent municipalities, with four seats assigned to Stratford, three to Somerdale and two to Magnolia. The Laurel Springs district appoints a representative to serve on the Sterling board of education.

== Misconduct Allegations ==
In April 2026, Sterling High School chemistry teacher and coach Jason Howe was arrested and charged with second-degree sexual assault and second-degree child endangerment following an investigation by the Camden County Prosecutor's Office.

According to officials, a student who was at least 16 years old reported having sexual intercourse with Howe at his apartment in March 2026. Howe was subsequently suspended by the district and banned from school property pending the outcome of the investigation. The district stated that it had been unaware of the allegations prior to the arrest and announced its cooperation with law enforcement.

== Notable alumni ==
- Brian Broomell (born 1958; class of 1976), quarterback who played in the Canadian Football League for the Edmonton Eskimos
- Donovan Casey (born 1996), professional baseball outfielder
- Steven Ferrari (born 1962, class of 1980), US Army major general
- Matthew Q. Gebert (born 1980, class of 1999), a white nationalist who was suspended from his position with the United States Department of State
- Ken Kelley (born 1960; class of 1978), captain of Penn State's national championship football team in 1982
- Sophia A. Nelson (born 1967, class of 1985), author and journalist
