= Software Tools Users Group =

Defunct computing organization

Software Tools Users Group (STUG)
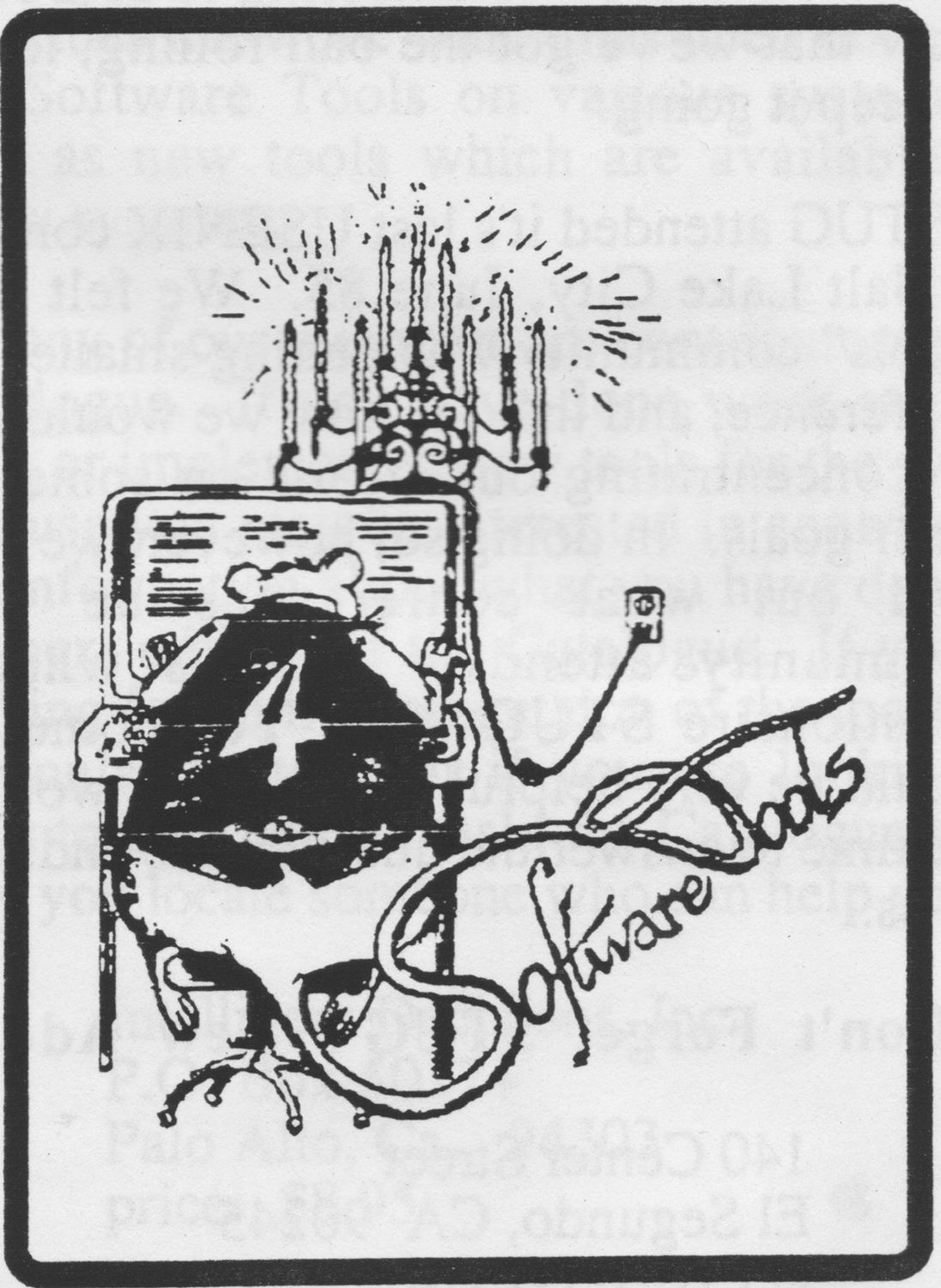
- The Software Tools Users Group
- Formation: c 1976; 50 years ago
- Headquarters: Lawrence Berkeley National Laboratory, Berkeley, California, United States
- Members: Over 2000 at its peak
- Coordinator: Deborah K. Scherrer
- Key people: Dennis E. Hall, Joseph S. Sventek

The Software Tools Users Group (STUG) was a technical organization started in 1976, in parallel with Usenix. The STUG goal was to develop a powerful and portable Unix-like system that could be implemented on top of virtually any operating system, providing the capabilities and features of Unix in a non-proprietary system. With its focus on building clean, portable, reusable code shared amongst multiple applications and runnable on any operating system, the Software Tools movement reestablished the tradition of open source and the concepts of empowering users to define, develop, control, and freely distribute their computing environment.

== History ==
In 1976, Brian Kernighan (then of Bell Labs) and P. J. Plauger published Software Tools, the first of their books on programming inspired by the recent creation of the Unix operating system by Kernighan's colleagues at Bell Labs. Software Tools demonstrated "Unix thinking" with programs in Ratfor, later rewritten in Pascal for a follow-up edition of the book. Kernighan's Ratfor (rational FORTRAN preprocessor) was eventually put in the public domain.

Deborah K. Scherrer, Dennis E. Hall, and Joseph S. Sventek, then researchers at the Lawrence Berkeley National Laboratory, quickly picked up the Software Tools book and philosophy. They expanded the initial set of a few dozen tools from the book into an entire Virtual Operating System (VOS), providing an almost complete set of the Unix tools, a Unix-like programming library, and an operating system interface that could be implemented on top of virtually any system. They freely distributed their VOS collection worldwide. Their work generated ports of the software to over 50 operating systems and a users group of more than 2000.

An LBNL research report appeared in Communications of the ACM in September 1980.

Scherrer, also on the Usenix Board at the Time, established and coordinated the Software Tools Users Group, aligning itself with Usenix Starting in 1979, STUG and Usenix held parallel conferences. STUG also produced a series of newsletters. STUG also coordinated with the European Unix Users Group and spawned similar groups in other parts of the world.

The Software Tools movement eventually triggered several commercial companies to port and distribute the Software Tools to microcomputer systems such as CP/M and MS-DOS.

== Awards ==
On January 24, 1996, Scherrer's, Hall's, and Sventek's work was recognized with a USENIX Lifetime Achievement Award (“The Flame”).

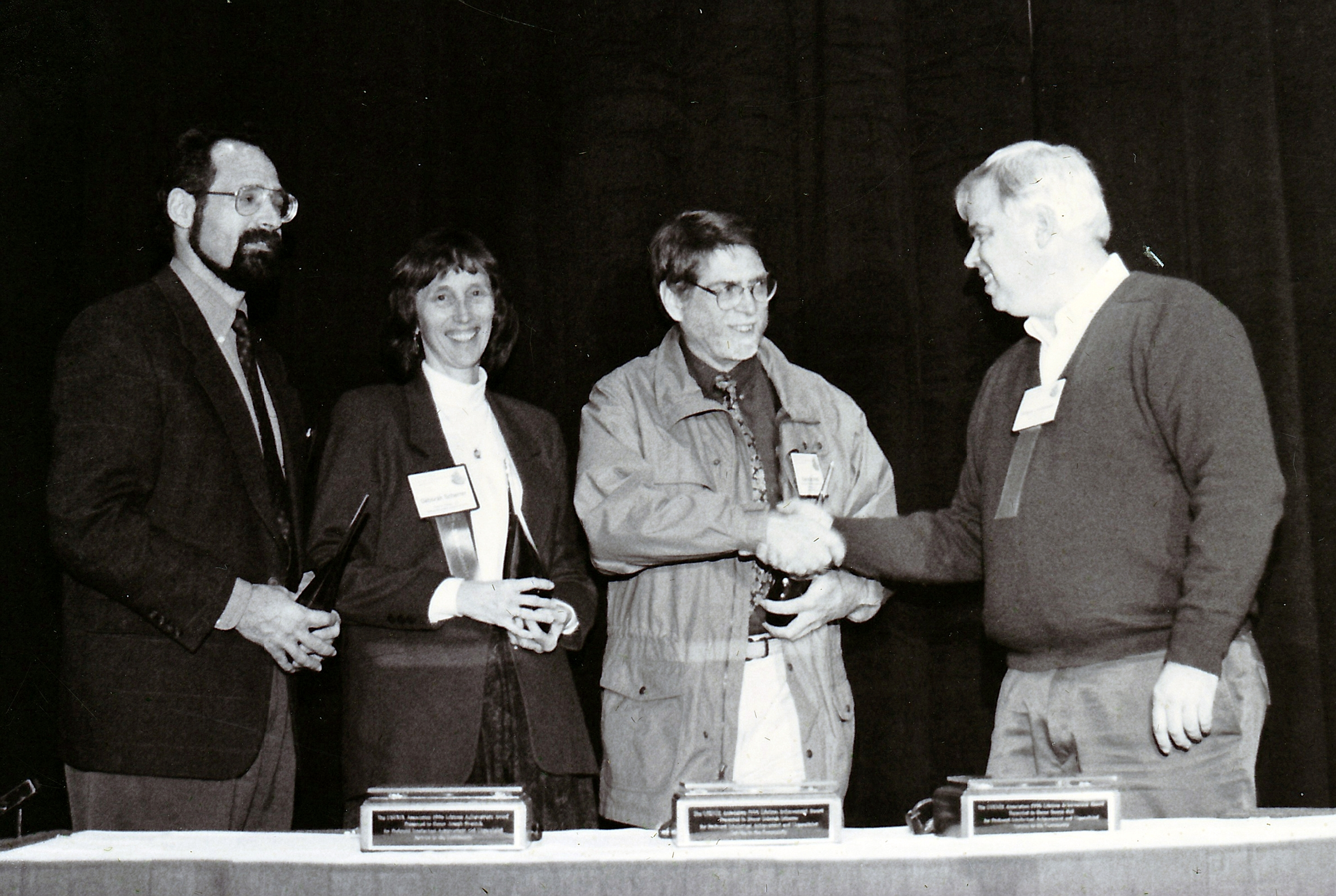
At the USENIX conference in 1996, Steve Johnson(r), then President of USENIX, presents the “Lifetime Achievement Award (The Flame)” to Joe Sventek (l), Deborah Scherrer (2nd from left), and Dennis Hall.

In 1993 Scherrer had previously been honored with a “UNIX Academic Driver” award presented by Bell Labs, for “Outstanding Contributions to the UNIX community”. Her work included the Software Tools movement as well as contributions to USENIX.

== Other Major Contributors ==
The Software Tools project was the result of efforts from hundreds of people at many, many sites. The USENIX STUG Lifetime Achievement Award includes the names of many, but certainly not all, major contributors to the Software Tools project.

Major contributors to the Software Tools project

== Legacy ==
By the late-1980s, Unix was becoming more available, Microsoft had taken over the PC market, and the need for the VOS environment started to subside. The STUG group decided to discontinue, choosing to donate the group's financial legacy to endow a yearly USENIX “STUG Award”. This award “recognizes significant contributions to the community that reflect the spirit and character demonstrated by those who came together in the Software Tools Users Group. Recipients of the annual STUG Award conspicuously exhibit a contribution to the reusable code base to all and/or the provision of a significant enabling technology to users in a widely available form.” .

== See also ==
- USENIX
- Unix
- Open-source model
- Brian Kernighan “The Unix Programming Environment”. Software: Practice and Experience, Vol 9, 1979.
- Peter H. Salus A Quarter Century of UNIX. Addison-Wesley: 1994.
- A complete copy of the Software Tools distributions from LBNL, the ports for Unix, CP/M, and MS-DOS, Pascal, and the original set from Addison-Wesley are available in the Computer History Museum and The Unix Heritage Society. These archives also contain most of the STUG newsletters and related articles.
- A complete distribution is available from unix-archive.ch.
