= Bram Cohen =

American programmer and author of the BitTorrent protocol

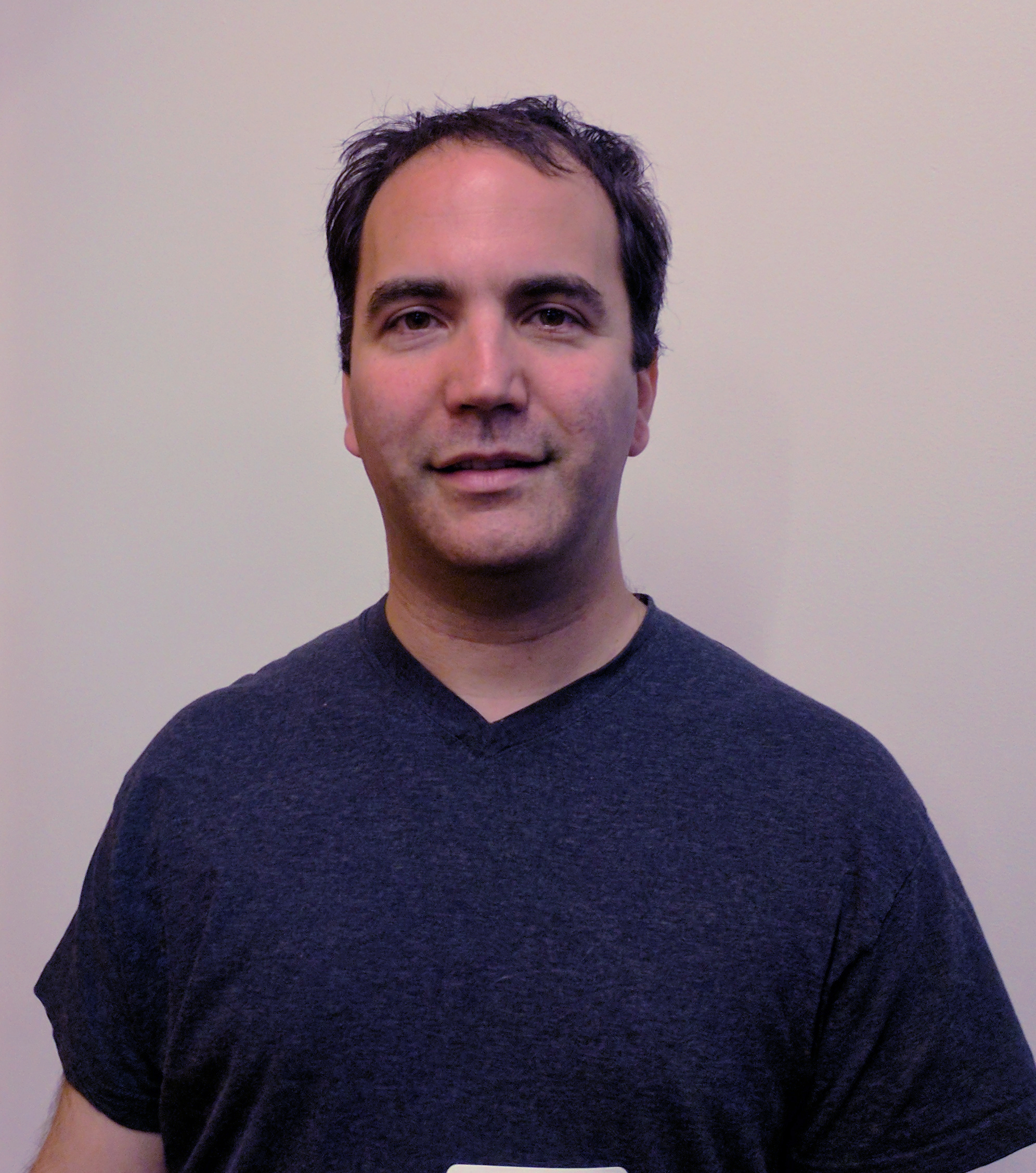
- Cohen in 2024
- Born: October 12, 1975 (age 51); New York City
- Education: University at Buffalo
- Occupations: Chief executive officer, Chia Network
- Known for: BitTorrent protocol
- Spouse: Jenna Cohen (divorced 2022)
- Children: 3
- Relatives: Ross Cohen (brother)
- Awards: USENIX STUG Award; Time 100; MIT TR35
- Website: bramcohen.com

Bram Cohen (born October 12, 1975) is an American computer programmer, best known as the author of the peer-to-peer (P2P) BitTorrent protocol in 2001, as well as the first file sharing program to use the protocol, also known as BitTorrent. He is also the co-founder of CodeCon and organizer of the San Francisco Bay Area P2P-hackers meeting, was the co-author of Codeville and creator of the Chia cryptocurrency which implements the proof of space-time consensus algorithm.

== Early life and career ==
Cohen grew up on the Upper West Side of Manhattan, New York City, as the son of a teacher and computer scientist. He claims he learned the BASIC programming language at the age of 5 on his family's Timex Sinclair computer. Cohen passed the American Invitational Mathematics Examination to qualify for the United States of America Mathematical Olympiad while he attended Stuyvesant High School in New York City. He graduated from Stuyvesant in 1993, and attended SUNY Buffalo. He later dropped out of college to work for several dot-com companies throughout the mid-to-late 1990s, the last being MojoNation, an ambitious but ill-fated project he worked on with Jim McCoy.

MojoNation allowed people to break up confidential files into encrypted chunks and distribute those pieces on computers also running the software. If someone wanted to download a copy of this encrypted file, they would have to download it simultaneously from many computers. This concept, Cohen thought, was perfect for a file-sharing program, since programs like KaZaA take a long time to download a large file because the file is (usually) coming from one source (or peer).

== BitTorrent ==
In April 2001, Cohen quit MojoNation and began work on BitTorrent. Cohen designed BitTorrent to be able to download files from many sources, thus speeding up the download time, especially for users with faster download than upload speeds. Thus, the more popular a file is, the faster a user will be able to download it, since many people will be downloading it at the same time, and these people will also be uploading the data to other users. Cohen unveiled his ideas at the first CodeCon conference, which he and his roommate Len Sassaman created as a showcase event for novel technology projects after becoming disillusioned with the state of then-current technology conferences.

Cohen wrote the first BitTorrent client implementation in Python. In the summer of 2002, Cohen collected free pornography to lure beta testers to use the program. In May 2005, Cohen released a trackerless beta version of BitTorrent. BitTorrent gained its fame for its ability to quickly share large music and movie files online. Since the early releases, many other programs have implemented the BitTorrent protocol.

Cohen has claimed he has never violated copyright law using his software. Regardless, he is outspoken in his belief that the traditional media business model is doomed to becoming outmoded, despite RIAA's and MPAA's legal and technical tactics, such as digital rights management.

In late 2003, Cohen worked for a short time at Valve, working on Steam, their digital distribution system introduced for Half-Life 2.

By 2004, he had left Valve and formed BitTorrent, Inc., with his brother Ross Cohen and business partner Ashwin Navin. In 2012, he announced a beta version of BitTorrent Live for TV broadcasting through the Internet. Cohen left BitTorrent, Inc., in a day-to-day capacity to co-found Chia Network in the fall of 2017.

=== BitTorrent and the MPAA ===
By mid-2005, BitTorrent, Inc., was funded by venture capitalist David Chao from Doll Capital Management, and in late 2005 Cohen and Navin made a deal with the MPAA to remove links to illegal content on the official BitTorrent website. The deal was with the seven largest studios in the United States. The agreement means the site will comply with procedures outlined in the Digital Millennium Copyright Act.

== Chia Network ==
Chia Network is a company founded by Cohen in 2017 that has implemented a proof-of-space-time cryptocurrency called Chia (XCH). Chia is intended to avoid the waste of energy involved in proof-of-work-based cryptocurrencies such as Bitcoin, and the vulnerability to state actors of proof-of-stake systems.

Chia Network has raised seed money from investors including Andreessen Horowitz. The use of storage media (hard disks and solid-state drives) as the cryptocurrency's mining medium has raised concerns over potential price surges and shortage of high-capacity storage devices, as well as radically reducing the lifetime of drives.

== Personal life ==
As of 2008, Cohen lived in the San Francisco Bay Area of the United States, with his wife Jenna and their three children. The couple divorced in 2022.

Cohen says that he has Asperger syndrome based on a self diagnosis.

Cohen's hobbies include original origami and juggling up to five balls, but his main interest is in recreational mathematics. Cohen maintains a blog where he frequently discusses trust metrics with software developer Raph Levien, as well as money systems, games of skill, and other math-related topics. He is also an assembly puzzle enthusiast. He has designed several puzzles including some in conjunction with Oskar van Deventer including several gear-based puzzles such as Gear Shift and a multiple Rubik's Cube variant called Bram's Fortress. Some of Cohen's puzzle designs are available for 3D printing via Shapeways.

== Awards ==
Cohen has received a number of awards for his work on the BitTorrent protocol, including:

- 2004 Wired Rave Award
- 2005 MIT Technology Review TR35 as one of the top 35 innovators in the world under the age of 35
- 2005 Time's 100 Most Influential People
- 2006 USENIX STUG Award
- 2010 Internet Evolution 100
