= Chia Network =

American blockchain technology company

- Type: Private
- Industry: Cryptocurrency
- Founded: 2017
- Founders: Bram Cohen, Ryan Singer
- Headquarters: South San Francisco, California, United States
- Key people: Gene Hoffman (CEO); Bram Cohen (CTO and Co-Founder)
- Website: www.chia.net

Chia Network is a proof-of-space and proof-of-time-based blockchain. It issues the digital currency Chia (XCH). It was founded in 2017 by Bram Cohen, the creator of BitTorrent, and Ryan Singer. Its headquarters are in South San Francisco, California.

== History ==
Chia Network was co-founded by Bram Cohen, the creator of BitTorrent, and Ryan Singer in 2017. Cohen said he was inspired by Bitcoin and the rise of cryptocurrency, and that he believed digital currencies would be safer, faster, and create more financial autonomy. He also had reservations about the various issues surrounding cryptocurrencies, such as the energy consumed in bitcoin mining. He created the Chia Network in an effort to design and launch the Chia blockchain, which used unused hard drive space, which would consume less energy than the proof of work protocol commonly used by blockchain networks.

Chia blockchain runs on the company's programming language Chialisp.

In 2018, Cohen raised $3.4 million in seed funding. Chia Network released a beta version of its blockchain and native token, XCH, to developers in April 2019. By the end of 2020, the network had 1,700 nodes. Following an early 2021 funding round in which Chia Network raised $61 million, the company was valued at $500 million. Investors in the company include Andreessen Horowitz, Naval Ravikant, Breyer Capital, and others.

By 2021, users had allocated approximately 40 billion gigabytes of storage to Chia Network. Rather than the typical initial coin offering used to launch many cryptocurrencies, Chia Network opted to reserve pre-farmed tokens and raise venture capital. That year, the company announced that it was considering going public via a traditional initial public offering (IPO) or by merging with a special-purpose acquisition company. When the company began trading XCH on May 3, 2021, it held 21 million tokens in reserve. According to Business Insider, the growth of the company and its XCH token led to a rise in prices of hard disk drives and solid-state drives. On April 14, 2023, the company announced that it was nearing an IPO having submitted a draft registration statement to the U.S. Securities and Exchange Commission.

In May 2021, Chia Network raised a $61 million investment, valuing the company at about $500 million. The same month, the company announced plans to conduct an IPO before the end of 2021. As of 2023, Chia had filed a draft registration with the Securities and Exchange Commission towards an IPO.

In China, stockpiling ahead of the May 2021 launch led to shortages and an increase in the price of hard disk drives (HDD) and solid-state drives (SSD). Shortages were also reported in Vietnam. Hard drive manufacturer Seagate said in May 2021 that the company was experiencing strong orders and that staff were working to "adjust to market demand". In May 2021 Gene Hoffman, then president and current CEO of Chia Network, admitted that "we’ve kind of destroyed the short-term supply chain" for hard disks. During the first months since Chia's launch, concerns were raised about the write-heavy prerequisite plotting process drastically shortening flash drive lifetimes. In late 2024 and early 2025, reports emerged of used hard drives being fraudulently resold as new, with Chia farms being identified as a likely source. These farms were reportedly closed because Chia mining was no longer profitable.

== Chia coin ==
Chia Network's native digital currency is the Chia (XCH) token. Users allocate unused storage space on their computers (rather than processing power as with proof of work cryptocurrencies such as Bitcoin) to operate the Chia blockchain and the proof-of-space-and-time consensus protocol. The process is described as "farming" and rewards users with XCH coins.

== Partnerships ==
In August 2022, the International Finance Corporation announced a partnership and fund with Chia Network, Aspiration, Inc., and Cultivo to tokenize and track carbon offsets. Chia Network also provides technology infrastructure for the Climate Action Data Trust, a partnership between the International Emissions Trading Association, World Bank, and the Government of Singapore, which seeks to enhance the overall integrity of carbon markets.
