= Matthew Q. Gebert =

American neo-Nazi and former foreign affairs officer in the U.S. State Department

Matthew Q. Gebert (born c. 1981) is an American former foreign affairs officer in the U.S. State Department. He was suspended from his position in August 2019 after he was reported as a white nationalist by the Southern Poverty Law Center.

Gebert joined the State Department in 2013. His brother reported him to the FBI in June 2019 for his activities. As of January 2020, Gebert was being investigated by the State Department, and was also active in the white nationalist movement.

== Personal life, career, and education ==
Matthew Gebert is the oldest of two brothers and one sister in his family, and he and Michael grew up in New Jersey. He graduated from Sterling High School in Somerdale, New Jersey. According to his brother, Matthew listened to hip hop, including the rap group Wu-Tang Clan. Voted by his class as "Most Likely to Succeed", Gebert had earlier participated in a student exchange program in Ukraine.

Gebert graduated from George Washington University in 2011. In 2001 he had participated in a study program in Moscow that was sponsored by American University. There he met his future wife, Anna Vuckovic, a Serbian-American student abroad in a study program of Northwestern University. Gebert also took other opportunities later for travel in Eastern Europe.

Gebert and Vuckovic married in 2007, and have children together. In 2012 the couple purchased a home in Leesburg, Virginia (a distant suburb of Washington, D.C.) and lived there until at least 2019.

Gebert joined the U.S. State Department in 2013, as a presidential management fellow, a program intended to develop "potential government leaders".

== Radicalization ==
According to his own account in a white nationalist forum, Gebert became radicalized in 2015. The reasons are unclear, although he had long been interested in Slavic culture and suggested the United States and the Slavic peoples had common interests. Gebert had studied and traveled numerous times in Russia and Eastern Europe since the fall of the Soviet Union.

He became a white nationalist, leading a Washington, D.C.-area fan club of a neo-fascist podcast called "The Right Stuff." He uses the online pseudonym "Coach Finstock", in addition to several others.

Gebert attended the May 2017 Unite the Right rally in Charlottesville, Virginia.

In a podcast called "The Fatherland" in May 2018, Gebert was quoted as saying: "...[whites] need a country of our own with nukes, and we will retake this thing lickety split." In 2018, Gebert donated $200 to white supremacist Paul Nehlen's election campaign. He has hosted known white nationalists in his home in Leesburg, Virginia. In 2019, he shared an image of a swastika-shaped cookie with the caption: "From our pool party last night. Plate was stacked." The cookies were saved for special guests.

State Department Spokesperson Morgan Ortagus declines to comment about Gebert's suspension on August 8, 2019.

On July 2, 2019, Matthew Gebert's brother reported him to the FBI because: "I saw so much evil in my brother, I could not fucking deal with it". Following an investigation, as of August 8, 2019, Gebert was placed on leave from the State Department.

The State Department officially revoked his security clearance in July 2020, ending his government career. Gebert filed a lawsuit against the DoS demanding financial reparations and restoration of his security credentials in 2024. In March of that year, the U.S. District Court of Washington, DC dismissed all of Gebert's claims for good. (https://ecf.dcd.uscourts.gov/cgi-bin/show_public_doc?2022cv2939-47)
