= Justin Sun =

Chinese-born crypto billionaire (born 1990)

- 孙宇晨
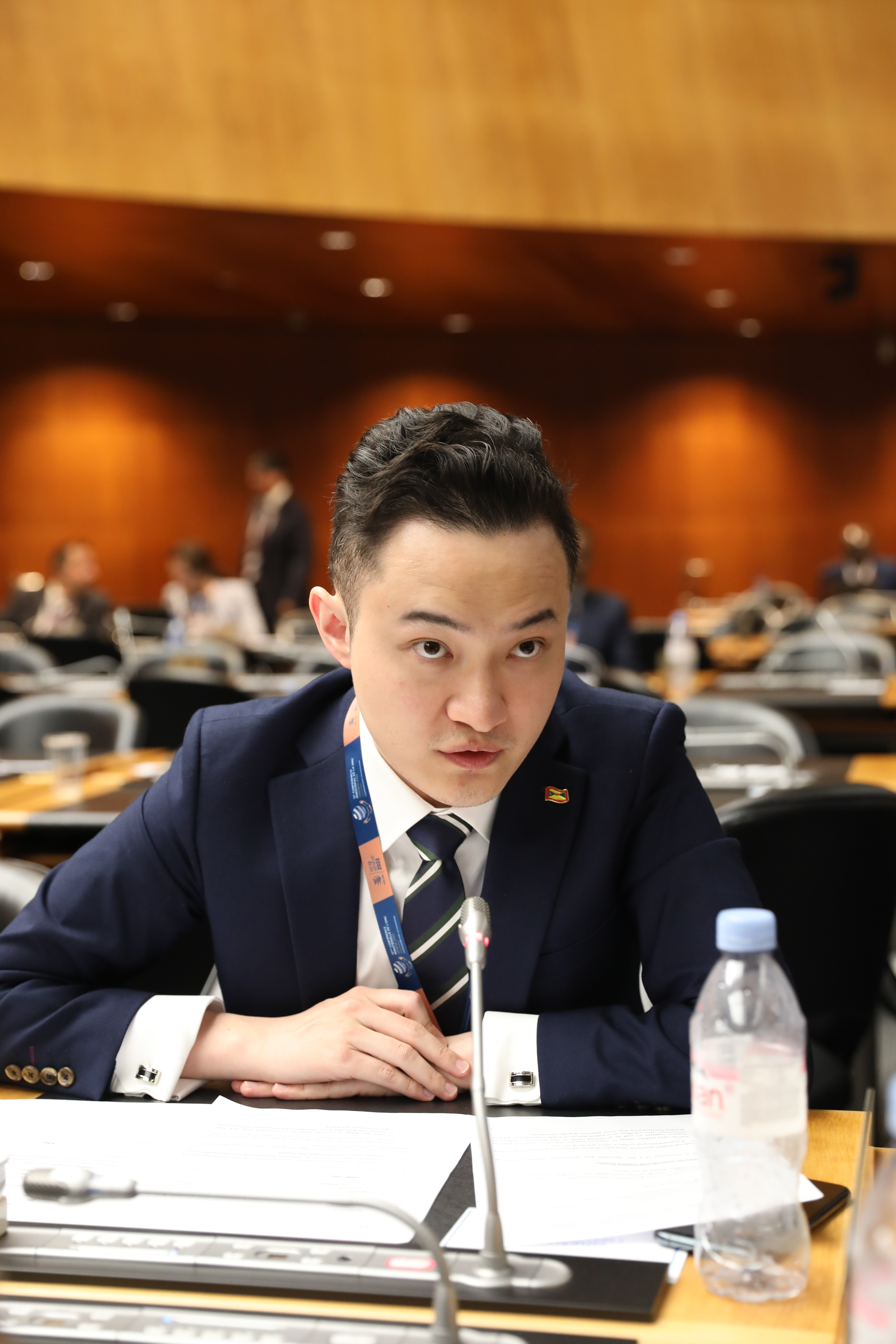
- Sun at MC12 in 2022

Permanent Representative of Grenada to the World Trade Organization
- In office 2021–2023

Personal details
- Born: July 30, 1990 (age 36) Xining, Qinghai, China
- Education: Peking University (BA); University of Pennsylvania (MA)
- Known for: Founding TRON
- Website: hejustinsun.com

Justin Sun (Chinese: 孙宇晨; pinyin: Sūn Yǔchén; born July 30, 1990) is a Chinese-born businessman. He is the founder of Tron, a blockchain, and its Tronix (TRX) cryptocurrency. He is also the developer of a stablecoin named USDD.

Sun owns Rainberry (formerly BitTorrent Inc.), the developer of BitTorrent protocol, and two cryptocurrency exchanges, Poloniex and HTX (formerly Huobi). He has been described as Trump family's "biggest crypto backer", heavily investing in the Trump family-associated World Liberty Financial, though he later fell out with the Trump family. From 2021 to 2023, Sun was the permanent representative of Grenada to the World Trade Organization. In 2026, Sun reached a settlement with the Securities and Exchange Commission (SEC) in connection with a fraud investigation.

As of April 2026, Forbes ranks Sun as the 411th-richest person in the world, estimating his net worth at $8.5 billion. His net worth is largely held in cryptocurrency.

== Early life and education ==
Sun was born in 1990 in Xining, Qinghai, China, and moved with his family to Huizhou, Guangdong, at the age of four. His mother worked as a journalist for the Huizhou Daily, while his father worked for the municipal planning bureau. During primary school, Sun traveled to Wuhan to study the Chinese strategy board game Go, and later participated in computer programming competitions during his secondary education. He developed an early interest in literature, particularly the works of Wang Xiaobo, Li Ao, and Han Han.

In 2004, Sun entered Huizhou No. 1 High School, where he initially performed poorly academically. After unsuccessful attempts to win the New Concept Writing Competition, he began preparing more intensively for the Gaokao during his final year of secondary school. In 2007, he won first prize in the ninth New Concept Writing Competition, earning eligibility for an independent admissions interview at Peking University and a concession allowing him to be admitted with a Gaokao score up to 20 points below the usual threshold. He then earned a score of 650 on the Gaokao and enrolled at Peking University in 2007.

At Peking University, Sun initially studied Chinese literature before transferring to the Department of History after his first year. In the autumn of 2009, he spent a semester as an exchange student at the Chinese University of Hong Kong. He later said that a course titled "Democracy and Society", taught by sociologist Chan Kin-man, inspired him to participate in demonstrations in Hong Kong. After returning to Beijing, he became involved in student activism and published political commentary on the social networking platform Renren, including an online column titled Weekly Review. In 2010, he unsuccessfully sought the presidency of the university's student union, withdrawing before the election took place. He also completed a journalism internship at Southern Weekly, during which he continued publishing commentary on university affairs and Chinese politics.

In 2011, Sun publicly criticized Peking University's proposed consultation system, which identified students experiencing academic difficulties, psychological vulnerability, financial hardship, or what the university described as politically radical thinking for targeted intervention. His writings attracted public attention, and in July 2011 he appeared alongside writer Jiang Fangzhou on the cover of the Hong Kong magazine Yazhou Zhoukan in a feature about China's post-1990 generation. He graduated from Peking University in 2011 with a bachelor's degree in history, ranking first with the highest grade point average (GPA) in the department.

== Career ==
In the autumn of 2011, Sun began graduate studies in East Asian studies at the University of Pennsylvania. Shortly after arriving in the U.S., he established an online magazine titled Xin Xin Qingnian (新新青年), modeled on the early twentieth-century Chinese intellectual journal New Youth. During his graduate studies, he began taking courses at the Wharton School. In 2012, he became interested in Bitcoin after reading a newspaper article about the cryptocurrency and began participating in online discussions and investing in digital assets. He earned his Master of Arts from the University of Pennsylvania in 2013.

In 2015, Sun joined the inaugural class of Hupan University, an entrepreneurship training institution established by Jack Ma, becoming the only member of the first cohort born in the 1990s. He completed the institution's three-year entrepreneurship program in 2018, writing a final thesis concerning blockchain technology and the development of Tron. In 2019, Sun donated US$1.5 million to Hupan University.

=== Cryptocurrency ===
In late 2013, Sun joined Ripple Labs as chief representative and adviser. He was a Davos Global Shaper in 2014.

Sun founded the blockchain-based operating platform Tron and launched the TRX token in 2017. Sun is known for his high expectations of Chinese Tron employees, demanding they adopt the 996 working hour system (9 am to 9 pm 6 days a week). In September 2017, Tron held an initial coin offering (ICO) for the TRX token, a few days before the Chinese government banned ICOs. According to The Verge, Sun was aware of the impending ban, and pushed for the sale to occur before the ban could be announced. Shortly afterwards, Sun left China for the United States. Tron raised about $70 million at its ICO. A cryptocurrency whitepaper Sun published attracted controversy following allegations that it was heavily derivative of earlier cryptocurrency whitepapers without any attribution. As of 2025, Sun controls the majority of TRX tokens in circulation.

In June 2018, Sun acquired the company BitTorrent, Inc (later renamed Rainberry Inc.) for $140 million. The company is best known for developing the BitTorrent protocol. During his tenure leading BitTorrent as CEO, the BitTorrent network launched its own utility token, BTT.

In late 2019, Sun acquired the crypto exchange Poloniex. He moved the company to the Seychelles, which has lax cryptocurrency regulation, and allegedly ordered the relaxing of the exchange's know your customer infrastructure. The Verge alleged in 2021 that Sun demanded that he should be given personal ownership of misplaced Poloniex customer funds that users accidentally sent to wrong wallet addresses, totaling about 300 bitcoin, despite the objections of Poloniex employees. In November 2023 Poloniex had $120 million stolen by hackers. Sun offered to let the hackers keep $6.5 million if they returned the rest of the money within 7 days.

In October 2021, Sun participated in a $65 million funding round in Hong Kong-based Animoca, a maker of crypto and blockchain video games such as The Sandbox.

Sun purchased the cryptocurrency exchange HTX (formerly Huobi) in 2022. In February 2023, he was the largest individual staked ether holder, with a balance of $500 million.

In May 2025, Sun attended a private dinner hosted by Donald Trump at Trump National Golf Club for top investors in the $TRUMP meme coin, having spent over $40 million on the token and placing first on its public leaderboard.

Tron became Nasdaq-listed in 2025 via a reverse takeover. The deal was brokered by Dominari Securities, a firm whose board of advisers includes Donald Trump Jr. and Eric Trump.

In May 2026, the UK government sanctioned HTX for alleged violations of international sanctions against Russia.

=== Lawsuits and investigations ===
In 2020, a civil lawsuit was filed against Sun by former Tron employees Lucasz Juraszek and Richard Hall, with allegations "ranging from fraud to harassment to whistleblower retaliation". The judge approved Sun's request for private arbitration of the civil case. The Verge alleged that Tron, at the direction of Sun, had engaged in market manipulation by buying/selling TRX tokens with non-public information; the magazine also alleged that as of 2022, Sun was under investigation by the Federal Bureau of Investigation (FBI), and by the United States Attorney in the Southern District of New York for potential criminal prosecution.

In March 2023, the U.S. Securities and Exchange Commission (SEC) filed suit against Sun for selling unregistered securities related to the sale and promotion of TRX and BTT tokens. Sun allegedly engaged in wash trading and other fraudulent practices to raise the price of TRX in secondary markets. In addition, eight celebrities were charged with astroturfing, where they promoted the cryptocurrencies without disclosing their sponsorship, including Akon, Ne-Yo, Austin Mahone, Soulja Boy, Lindsay Lohan, Jake Paul, Lil Yachty, and Michele Mason (Kendra Lust). All of the defendants except Soulja Boy and Austin Mahone settled their cases, making payments in excess of $400,000 without admitting liability. Gary Gensler, then head of the SEC, said his organization have "alleged significant fraud around Justin Sun and Tron", and, "this is a field that is rife with fraud and scams and mischief".

The SEC dropped its lawsuit against Sun in February 2025, following Donald Trump's inauguration as president. News media sources noted that Sun had purchased $75 million worth of tokens from the Trump-associated World Liberty Financial prior to the SEC dropping the case. According to the Wall Street Journal, the decision "surprised" a number of SEC officials, who were "highly confident in winning the case". Prior to dropping the case, Justin Sun reportedly avoided travel to the United States to avoid being arrested. Following the SEC's announcement for the settlement, Democrat Elizabeth Warren of the Senate Banking Committee criticized the deal, stating "the SEC should not be a lap dog for Trump's billionaire buddies".

In April 2026, Sun, the largest investor in World Liberty, filed a lawsuit against the Trump-associated company in federal court in California for "extortion", alleging that it had unlawfully frozen his holdings of WLFI tokens after they became tradable in September 2025, resulting in claimed losses of approximately $276 million. The lawsuit also alleged that World Liberty had threatened to "burn", or permanently destroy, the tokens held in Sun’s digital wallet. In May 2026, World Liberty sued back, alleging Sun of defamation for engaging in a public campaign to damage the company's reputation and improperly transferred and shorted WLFI tokens.

=== Diplomacy ===
Sun was appointed Ambassador and Permanent Representative of Grenada, an island country of the West Indies, to the World Trade Organization (WTO) in 2021. As a result, Sun phased out of his daily roles at his crypto-related projects such as Tron in order to focus on his diplomatic role at the WTO in Geneva. Sun told Bloomberg he would use his role to advocate cryptocurrency and blockchain technology to countries and promote technology development in Grenada. Sun said the Caribbean has "become a very good place for entrepreneurship" because of its close proximity to the U.S., with less strict regulations regarding cryptocurrency. Sources speaking to The Wall Street Journal alleged that he sought the position to obtain diplomatic immunity amid investigation by the U.S. Department of Justice.

In December 2021, Sun retired as a CEO of Tron to become a diplomat for Grenada.

In March 2023, Sun stepped down from his position as Permanent Representative of Grenada to the World Trade Organization, which followed the previous governing party of Grenada which had appointed him losing power following the general election the previous year.

In October 2024, Sun was elected as a "Speaker of Congress" and appointed as "Prime Minister" of Liberland, a micronation (self-proclaimed country) that claims to own (but does not control) a small region on the Danube river floodplain border between Serbia and Croatia.

=== Internet ===
In 2014, Sun launched Peiwo, an app aspiring to become China's Snapchat that matched and connected users by analyzing 10-second voice samples as well interests. Peiwo has introduced a host of channels for users to make like-minded friends, with online games, talent shows and live streaming. The South China Morning Post described it as a "hook-up app", while The Verge described the app as an "audio-based mashup of Tinder and a live-stream chat room". According to The Verge, the audio chatrooms of Peiwo often had sexually explicit content, which The Verge described as "often border[ing] on some kind of aural pornography". Eventually Peiwo was removed from the Google Play and Apple App Store and shut down by the Chinese government around 2019 for content that "disrupts socialist values."

== Personal life ==
In 2017, Sun published his autobiography Brave New World in China, prefaced by businessman Feng Lun, cartoonist Cai Yuedong, and TV host Chen Luyu.

Sun's account on the Chinese microblogging website, Weibo, was banned in 2019.

=== Citizenship and relationship with the Chinese Communist Party ===
Sun is a citizen of Saint Kitts and Nevis. Sometime between 2018 and 2020, Sun acquired a Maltese residency card as a result of investing in the country. He has also attempted to gain citizenship from other countries, including Guinea-Bissau.

A 2022 report by The Verge quoted former Tron employees as saying that Sun "can never return to China". The report nevertheless noted that his "exact relationship with the Chinese authorities has been difficult to surmise", as an article by Sun about blockchain appeared on Xuexi Qiangguo, and he received a blockchain-related teaching appointment at the Central Party School in 2022. The report suggested that this apparent rapprochement may have been facilitated by his alleged connection to Luo Dan, a "special assistant" to the Panchen Lama. In the 2026 post on X, Sun implied that he could not go to mainland China, though he could be in Hong Kong.

=== Warren Buffett private meal ===
Sun placed the winning $4.6 million bid to have a private meal with Warren Buffett in June 2019, before canceling it to widespread surprise. In July, Caixin attributed the cancellation to Sun having been placed under border controls while Chinese authorities considered investigating him for suspected illegal fundraising, money laundering, pornography, and gambling-related offences. Sun denied the report and livestreamed from San Francisco on X, and Caixin further alleged that he had fled China despite having been under border controls since June 2018. Former employees told The Verge that Chinese authorities had pressured Sun to cancel the lunch because Buffett was a "capitalist pig symbol", particularly after he invited US president Donald Trump amid the China–US trade war. The Verge also reported that authorities raided Tron’s offices and detained Sun’s estranged father. The dinner with Buffett, a critic of cryptocurrency, eventually occurred at the Happy Hollow Club in Omaha, Nebraska, on January 23, 2020. Sun was joined by other cryptocurrency executives, including leaders of Litecoin, eToro, Huobi, and Binance Charity Foundation. At the dinner, Sun gifted Buffett a phone with bitcoin and other cryptocurrencies. The money from the charity auction benefited the Glide Foundation, which Buffett's late wife Susan introduced to Buffett after volunteering there.

In December 2021, Sun announced that he had previously bid $28 million to be the first paying passenger on Blue Origin's first crewed mission into space on the New Shepard. Although he had won the auction, he was unable to attend the July 2021 flight due to a scheduling conflict. He flew to space in August 2025 aboard Blue Origin NS-34.

In November 2024, Sun purchased one of the three limited edition rights to Comedian, a 2019 conceptual artwork by Maurizio Cattelan consisting of a banana duct-taped to a wall, for $5.2 million ($6.2 million including fees) at an auction in New York. Shortly after the purchase he ate the banana onstage. Sun later pledged to buy 100,000 bananas from the New York street vendor who the banana was originally purchased from (reportedly for 25 cents).

=== Tian Jing ===
In 2026, Sun broke up with the actress Tian Jing on the suggestion of a chatbot. Sun alleges that Jing requested an additional $50 million prior to her planned egg-retrieval process. Unsure, he consulted Claude, the large language model developed by Anthropic, and refused to send the payment on the chatbot's advice, thus ending their relationship. Sun later sued Jing and her parents for more than ¥30 million that he described as a betrothal gift. Following his breakup in relationship, Sun said that "for the first time in [his] life", he questioned the suggestions given by Claude.

Jing responded to Sun's claims on Weibo, claiming that she would not "ever sell [her] love for money, let alone [her] soul". She went on to comment that her "judgment in men is still poor", and "still lacking in wisdom".

Sun published a social media post on X (formerly known as Twitter) with intimate personal details of their relationships, followed by disclaiming that the entire post is "fictional". His post received widespread criticism from the Internet. Xijin Hu, Changpeng Zhao (CZ) and Xiaochuan Wang criticized Sun's improper disclosure of details related to Jing's private life. In response to Hu, Sun framed high bride prices as part of a broader marriage and fertility crisis in China. Both parties have reportedly been subject to online censorship, with their names seemingly removed from trending topics sections on Chinese social media, leading to speculation that they had been blacklisted. Sun's financial portfolio was also subject to online trading restrictions in multiple jurisdictions.

On August 31, Sun's cryptocurrency exchange HTX became inaccessible due to denial-of-service (DDoS) cyberattacks. The self-claimed attacker described their motivation as "disappointment to Sun's recent behavior", and said the attacks are to "teach him a lesson". That same day, Sun issued multiple claims of copyright infringement against negative reports about him.

== Bibliography ==
- Sun, Yuchen (2017). 这世界既残酷也温柔 [Brave New World] (in Chinese). Jiuzhou Press. ISBN 978-7510850660.
