= Steemit =

American blockchain-based blogging and social media website

- Website type: Social media platform
- Website: steemit.com
- Registration: Free
- Users: 1,238,717 registered users
- Launched: March 24, 2016; 10 years ago
- Current status: Active

Steemit is an American blockchain-based blogging and social media website. Users can gain a cryptocurrency, more specifically STEEM, for publishing and curating content (i.e., posts). Users can also be rewarded with STEEM based on their comments. The company is owned by Steemit Inc., a privately held company based in New York City and a headquarters in Virginia. HIVE is the official cryptocurrency on the successful fork of the main Steem blockchain in 2020. In addition, this fork has many of the features of the main Steem blockchain and a series of original ones, such as badges.

== Operating principle ==
Steemit is designed as a decentralized application (DApp) built upon the Steem blockchain, using the eponymous cryptocurrency STEEM to reward users for their content. By voting on posts and comments, users get to decide the payout of those posts. Users also receive "Curation Rewards" for finding and upvoting content that gets upvoted by other users afterwards.

== History ==
On 4 July 2016, Steemit, Inc., a company founded by Ned Scott and blockchain developer Daniel Larimer, launched the social media platform Steemit as the first application built upon the Steem blockchain. On 14 July 2016, Steemit announced on their website that they had been hacked. The attack, according to them, has compromised about 260 accounts. About US$85,000 worth of Steem Dollars and STEEM were reported to have been taken by the attackers. In March 2017, Larimer stepped back as Steemit's chief technology officer and left the company. With the STEEM price dropping during the 2018 cryptocurrency crash, Steemit faced financial difficulties and had to lay off 70% of its staff. In 2020, Steem successfully forked and the HIVE blockchain was created in the process.
