= Rainberry, Inc. =

American company

- Formerly: BitTorrent, Inc.
- Type: Private
- Industry: Internet software and services
- Founded: 2004; 22 years ago
- Founders: Bram Cohen; Ashwin Navin
- Headquarters: San Francisco, California, United States
- Area served: Worldwide
- Key people: Steve Liu (CEO); Ashwin Navin
- Products: Consumer Freeware; Content Delivery; Embedded Software
- Number of employees: 110 (2012)
- Parent: TRON Foundation
- Subsidiaries: DLive
- Website: www.rainberry.com

Rainberry, Inc., formerly known as BitTorrent, Inc., is an American company responsible for μTorrent and BitTorrent Mainline. The company was founded on September 22, 2004 by Bram Cohen and Ashwin Navin. It was successful during the Great Recession under the leadership of CEO Eric Klinker. In 2018, the company was acquired by cryptocurrency startup TRON, and Bram Cohen left the company. In March 2022, the SEC charged Rainberry with fraud for selling cryptocurrencies Tronix (TRX) and BitTorrent (BTT) as unregistered securities.

== History ==
The company was founded in 2004 by Bram Cohen and Ashwin Navin, and became the inventor of "μtorrent and BitTorrent software and a pioneering San Francisco company in decentralized peer-to-peer file sharing technology." According to the San Francisco Times at its peak, BitTorrent in the early 2010s had up to a quarter billion active monthly users, while its protocol "accounted for virtually half of file-sharing bandwidth on the Internet."

The name change from BitTorrent, Inc to Rainberry, Inc was conducted in 2017 without an official announcement. The CPO Jordy Berson stated that the rename was "purely a corporate decision".

Tron, a cryptocurrency startup, acquired Rainberry in 2018, with Tron later introducing BTT, a BitTorrent cryptocurrency token. The token aimed to help monetize Rainberry's software, which had been supported by advertising in the user interface since its inception.

In early 2023 Rainberry Inc. closed its San Francisco headquarters in the Financial District and laid off 92 employees. In March 2023, Justin Sun served as CEO of Rainberry, Tron, and Peiwo simultaneously.

In March 2023, the SEC sued Tron founder Justin Sun, the Tron foundation, the BitTorrent Foundation, and Rainberry Inc. over the sale of TRX and BTT tokens, and over the debate as to whether they counted as unregistered crypto asset securities.

== BitTorrent software ==
BitTorrent is a peer-to-peer computer program developed by Bram Cohen and BitTorrent, Inc. that is used for uploading and downloading files via the BitTorrent protocol. BitTorrent was the first client written for the protocol. It is often nicknamed Mainline by developers, denoting its official origins. Since version 6.0, the BitTorrent client has been a rebranded version of μTorrent. As a result, it is no longer open source and is currently available for Microsoft Windows and Mac OS X.

=== μTorrent ===
'μTorrent' is a freeware, closed source BitTorrent client owned by BitTorrent, Inc. It is available for Microsoft Windows, Android and Mac OS X. A μTorrent Server is available for Linux. All versions are written in C++.

On December 7, 2006, μTorrent was purchased by BitTorrent, Inc., as it was announced on their official forum.

=== BitTorrent/μTorrent Pro ===
Pro is the name received by advanced versions, formerly branded Plus, of BitTorrent and μTorrent. These are premium versions of the Windows software with additional features that are downloaded and installed when the user upgrades for US$19.95. Pre-sales for Plus were announced November 29, 2011 and the upgrade became available December 8, 2011. A "Pro" version of uTorrent for Android also exists, for a lower initial price, though in-app purchases can take it over the cost of the desktop version.

When a user upgrades to the Pro version of BitTorrent or μTorrent they enable the following features:

- Anti-virus protection for acquired .torrent files
- Integrated HD media player
- Transcoding capability with media codecs
- Streaming playback while torrent is downloading

=== BitTorrent Sync ===
BitTorrent Sync is a peer-to-peer file synchronization tool running on Windows, Mac, and Linux. It can sync files between computers on a local network, or between remote users over the Internet.

The BitTorrent Sync pre-Alpha program, announced in January 2013, was opened to general users on April 23, 2013. On November 23, 2013, BitTorrent announced the release of version 1.2 of the client along with a beta version of the BitTorrent Sync API.

On June 1, 2016, product and team were spun out of BitTorrent Inc. as an independent company, Resilio Inc. which will continue development of the product under the name Resilio Sync.

=== BitTorrent Bundle ===
The company has released "Bundles" with artists such as Linkin Park, Pixies, Public Enemy, and Madonna. The Madonna Bundle, entitled secretprojectrevolution, was released on September 24, 2013 and consisted of the 17-minute film of the same name, stills from the film, and an option for those users who submit their email addresses and make a donation that also includes HD and 2K versions of the film, a VICE interview, and a message from Madonna.

On September 17, 2013, the company launched "BitTorrent Bundles for Publishers", an alpha program for content creators to distribute bundles of any size and file type using the BitTorrent client. The first released bundle was the fantasy feature film "Overturn: Awakening of the Warrior" starring Ukrainian Vietnamese actor Ivan Doan

On September 26, 2014, Thom Yorke released his album Tomorrow's Modern Boxes as the first paid Bundle, priced at US$6.00. On October 3, 2014, it was announced that the project had been downloaded over 1 million times, which included the free single and video plus the paid downloads; sales numbers have not been released.

On October 28, 2014, Alice in Chains released their music video for "Phantom Limb" via BitTorrent Bundle for free streaming and download. The bundle also included the video treatment and the shot list in PDF, as well as access to the band's merch.

=== BitTorrent DNA ===
BitTorrent, Inc. also offers BitTorrent DNA (Delivery Network Accelerator), a free content delivery service based on the BitTorrent protocol that allows content providers to distribute their content using the bandwidth of their users.

=== SoShare (beta) ===
On January 5, 2012, SoShare was released in alpha as "Share" within the μTorrent client, as a standalone desktop client and as a plug-in based web client. On February 15, 2013, the SoShare beta was launched and repositioned as a user-friendly web application that uses the BitTorrent protocol, designed for creative industry professionals to share high-res photos, files and videos using the app's email system or public links. From the official website, the service messages that registered users can send file bundles containing up to one terabyte of data per send, free.

=== Discontinued software ===
==== BitTorrent Live ====
First announced in September 2011 and was first publicly tested on October 14, 2011. BitTorrent premiered Live in public beta in March 2013. The platform was used to showcase live streaming events of musical acts and DJs. It was shut down in 2017. In March 2019 it was announced that BitTorrent Live is going to return in the form of Snapchat-like social media app for Android and iOS.

==== BitTorrent Bleep ====
BitTorrent Bleep is a multi-platform, peer-to-peer, serverless chat client available free on Windows, Mac, Android and iOS. Bleep was never officially discontinued, but as of August 2017 the website no longer exists, the Windows application is no longer available to download from their website, or on the Google Play store, the Bleep Blog hasn't been updated since August 2015, and the Bleep forums no longer have any active moderators participating.

==== Project Maelstrom ====
On December 10, 2014, BitTorrent announced Project Maelstrom, a Chromium-based browser project that enables censorship-resistant distributed Web publishing by utilizing the BitTorrent and DHT protocols. Initially, the project was run as a closed alpha, but was then opened as a public beta available for Windows only. Although no official discontinue notice has been announced as of February 2017, the BitTorrent Inc. website no longer provides the browser for download, the last build has not been updated past Chromium version 44, and the last post by the project lead staff was on September 14, 2015.

== DLive ==
In late 2019, BitTorrent purchased DLive, which was created in 2017 as a blockchain-based video game streaming platform with lax moderation and generous monetization plans. Around this time, DLive became popular with far-right extremists and conspiracy theorists who had been banned from other platforms. According to the Southern Poverty Law Center, "DLive has paid out hundreds of thousands of dollars to extremists since its founding, largely through donations of cryptocurrency built into a service provided by the site." DLive was used by multiple creators to stream and coordinate the 2021 storming of the United States Capitol. Several of these streamers were subsequently banned by DLive.

== Partners ==
According to the company's website, BitTorrent Inc. has announced partnerships with many companies, including, for venture capital, Accel Partners and DCM, technology partners ESA Flash Components, NTL:Telewest, Opera Software, and device partners Buffalo Technology, D-Link, I-O Data, Marvell Semiconductors, Netgear, Planex Communications Inc., and QNAP Systems, Inc.

== See also ==
- Peer-to-peer web hosting
- BitTorrent, a peer-to-peer file sharing protocol used for distributing data
- μTorrent, a freeware closed source BitTorrent client by BitTorrent, Inc.
- BitTorrent, a freeware closed source BitTorrent client by BitTorrent, Inc.
- BitTorrent DNA, a "Delivery Network Accelerator"
- Comparison of BitTorrent clients
