= Jurvetson =

Jurvetson is a surname. Notable people with the surname include:

- Karla Jurvetson (born 1965/1966), American physician, ex-wife of Steve
- Reet Jurvetson (1950–1969), Canadian-American murder victim
- Steve Jurvetson (born 1967), American businessman and venture capitalist
