= Zeidman =

Zeidman is a surname. Notable people with this surname include:

- B. F. Zeidman (1896-1970), Hollywood film producer
- Michael Zeidman (born 1985), singer, actor, pianist, and musician
- Robert Zeidman (born 1960), American electrical engineer and inventor
