= Yael Tauman Kalai =

Cryptographer and theoretical computer scientist

- יעל טאומן קלעי
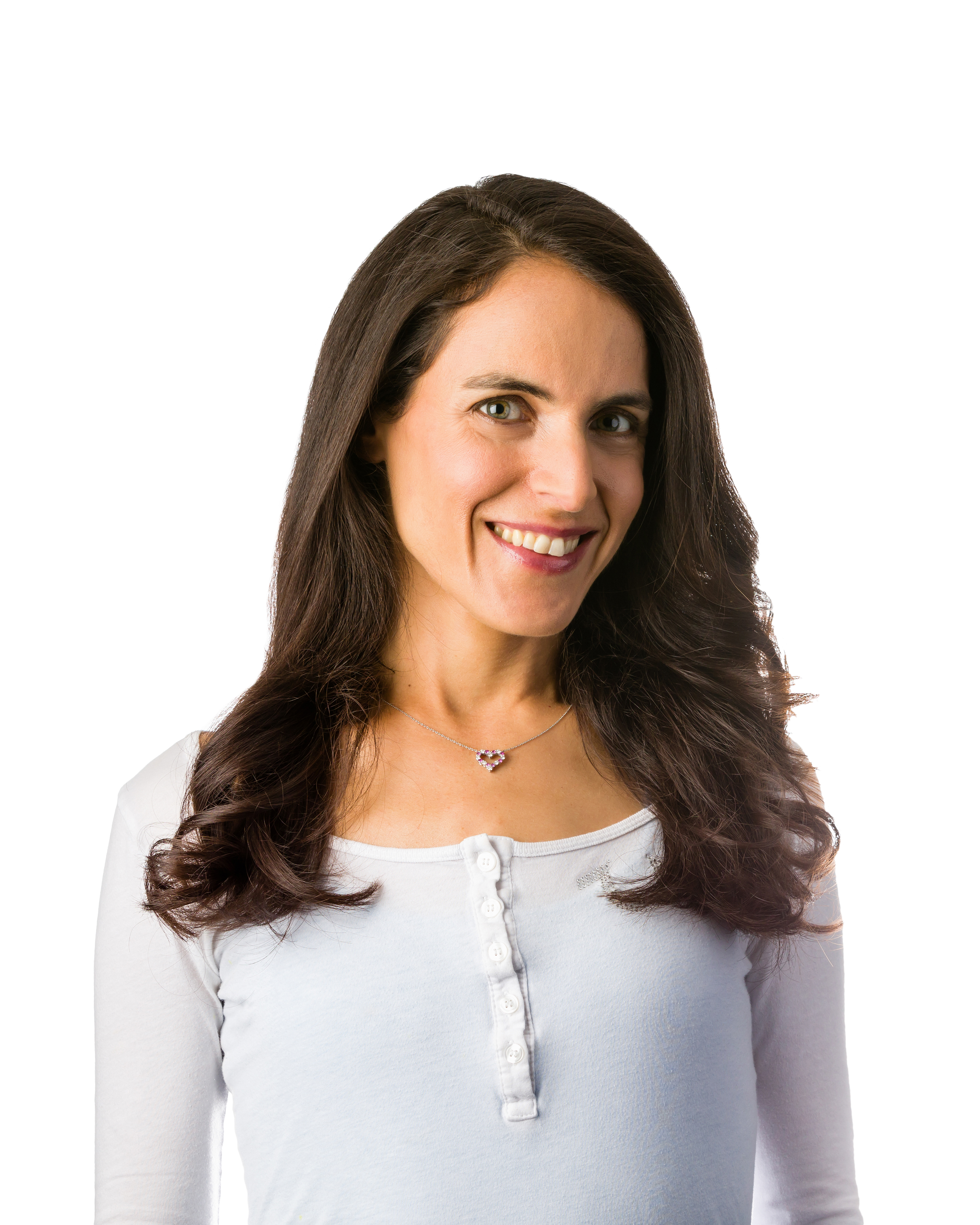
- Born: Tel Aviv, Israel
- Education: Hebrew University of Jerusalem (BSc); Weizmann Institute (MS); MIT (PhD)
- Known for: Ring signatures Insecurity of the Fiat–Shamir heuristic Delegating computation
- Relatives: Yair Tauman (father)
- Awards: ACM Prize in Computing (2022); IACR Fellow (2022)
- Scientific career
- Fields: Cryptography; Theoretical computer science
- Workplaces: Microsoft Research; MIT
- Doctoral advisor: Shafi Goldwasser
- Doctoral students: Elette Boyle

Yael Tauman Kalai (Hebrew: יעל טאומן קלעי) is a cryptographer and theoretical computer scientist and the Ellen Swallow Richards Professor at MIT in the Computer Science and Artificial Intelligence Laboratory. Previously, she worked as a Senior Principal Researcher at Microsoft Research New England.

== Education and career ==
Kalai graduated from the Hebrew University of Jerusalem in 1997. She earned a master's degree in 2001 at the Weizmann Institute of Science, working with Adi Shamir, and then completed a PhD advised by Shafi Goldwasser at MIT in 2006. After postdoctoral study at Microsoft Research and the Weizmann Institute, she became a faculty member at the Georgia Institute of Technology. She took a permanent position at Microsoft Research in 2008 and became a professor at MIT in 2024. She serves on the Scientific Advisory Board of the Simons Institute for the Theory of Computing.

== Contributions ==
Kalai is known for co-inventing ring signatures, which have become a key component of numerous systems such as Cryptonote and Monero (cryptocurrency). Subsequently, together with her advisor Shafi Goldwasser, she demonstrated an insecurity in the widely used Fiat–Shamir heuristic. Her work on delegating computation has applications to cloud computing.

== Recognition ==
Kalai was elected a Fellow of the International Association for Cryptologic Research in 2022 for foundational contributions in delegated computation and leakage-resilient cryptography, and service to the cryptographic community.

Kalai was an invited speaker on mathematical aspects of computer science at the 2018 International Congress of Mathematicians.

Her master's thesis introducing ring signatures won an outstanding master's thesis award and her MIT PhD dissertation was awarded the George M. Sprowls Award for Outstanding PhD Thesis in Computer Science.

She was co-chair of the Theory of Cryptography Conference in 2017.

She was awarded the 2022 ACM Prize in Computing "for breakthroughs in verifiable delegation of computation and fundamental contributions to cryptography".

== Personal ==
Kalai is the daughter of game theorist Yair Tauman. Her husband, Adam Tauman Kalai, works at OpenAI.
