= Tinklenberg =

Tinklenberg is a surname. Notable people with the surname include:

- Elwyn Tinklenberg (born 1950), American politician
- Jared Tinklenberg (born 1939), American psychiatrist
- Karla Jurvetson (née Tinklenberg, born 1965/66), American psychiatrist, philanthropist, and political organizer
