= MobileCoin =

Cryptocurrency

Denominations
- Code: MOB

Development
- Original author(s): Josh Goldbard & Shane Glynn
- White paper: MobileCoin
- Initial release: December 7, 2020; 5 years ago
- Code repository: github.com/mobilecoinfoundation, github.com/mobilecoinofficial
- Development status: Active
- Written in: Rust
- Operating system: Linux, Redhat, Ubuntu, macOS, Android, iOS
- Developer(s): Sara Drakeley H. (CTO), Henry Holtzman (CIO), part of a team of ~50 engineers
- Source model: FOSS
- License: GPLv3

Ledger
- Circulating supply: 250,000,000

Website
- Website: sentz.com

MobileCoin, also known as Sentz, is a peer-to-peer cryptocurrency developed by MobileCoin Inc., which was founded in 2017 by Josh Goldbard and Shane Glynn.

== History ==
MobileCoin, was founded in 2017 by Joshua Goldbard and Shane Glynn.

Signal's Moxie Marlinspike and former DARPA researcher Todd Huffman assisted as early technical advisors. The coin is intended to be an accessible form of cryptocurrency with a focus on fast transactions.

In May 2018, MobileCoin secured $29.7 million in a funding round led by Binance Labs, in exchange for 37.5 million tokens.

In July 2020, the company announced that disinformation researcher and former CIA fellow Renée DiResta would be joining the board of directors of the MobileCoin foundation.

In August 2020, the company announced that Neuralink general counsel and disinformation researcher Alex Feerst would be joining the board of directors.

In March 2021, MobileCoin raised $11.35 million in Series A funding from the venture firms General Catalyst and Steve Jurvetson's Future Ventures with Jurvetson eventually joining the board of directors. Jurvetson would at some point join the board of MobileCoin.

In August 2021, MobileCoin raised $66 million in Series B funding from investors including Alameda Research, Coinbase Ventures, Gaingels, and Marc Benioff.

In December 2021, Bob Lee, former CTO of Square (now Block), joined MobileCoin as Chief Product Officer, having been an early investor and advisor to the company. Lee's time at the company was cut short after he was murdered in 2023.

In January 2023, Todd Huffman joined MobileCoin as a director.

== Technology overview ==
MobileCoin claims to focus on transactional anonymity (fungibility), ease of use, transaction speed, low environmental impact and low fees. MobileCoin's mechanics build on Stellar (for consensus) and Monero (for privacy), using CryptoNote alongside zero-knowledge proofs to hide details of users' transactions.

The MobileCoin company claims the cryptocurrency can facilitate decentralized payments for everyday transactions more quickly than most other cryptocurrencies.

MobileCoin is a one dimensional cryptocurrency blockchain. Blocks use a consensus protocol originally developed for the Stellar payment network. Transactions are validated in SGX secure enclaves and are based on elliptic-curve cryptography. Transaction inputs are shown to exist in the blockchain with Merkle proofs of membership and are signed with Schnorr-style multilayered linkable ring signature, and output amounts (communicated to recipients via ECDH) are concealed with Pedersen commitments and proven in a legitimate range with non-interactive zero-knowledge proofs.

Much of MobileCoin's technology comes from previous privacy focused cryptocurrencies like Monero and has been re-written in Rust for MobileCoin.

== Payment and trading ==
In-app payments via Signal and Mixin Messenger support MobileCoin for peer-to-peer payments worldwide. The cryptocurrency exchange BigONE currently lists MobileCoin for trading.

== Criticisms and controversies ==
=== Signal Integration ===
The integration of MobileCoin wallets into the popular security focused messenger app Signal received criticism. Security expert Bruce Schneier, who previously praised the app, stated that this would bloat the app and attract unwanted attention from the financial authorities.

=== Affiliations with FTX ===
MobileCoin began its affiliation with FTX in 2021 after FTX's sister company Alameda Research participated in MobileCoin's Series B investment round.

In 2021, MobileCoin played a role in the financial collapse of FTX. A buyer on the FTX platform purchased a large amount of MobileCoin, artificially driving up the price, and then borrowed against it on FTX. The platform had to buy out the trader to protect itself, and survived thanks to a loan from sister company Alameda Research, resulting in a loss as great as $1 billion.

In April 2022, MobileCoin cohosted a happy hour with FTX at Crypto Bahamas 2022.

=== DAY v. BOYER ===
In 2017, a MobileCoin employee named Dustin Boyer offered to sell Pamela Day, an investor and former contestant of The Apprentice, 97,165 Mobilecoin tokens for the cost of $97,165. Boyer did not invest her money as promised but instead kept it for himself, comingled it with his own funds, and refused to return her money.

In 2019, Day filed a legal action against Boyer to have the funds returned which was resolved in Day's favor in 2020.
