= Bob Lee (businessman) =

American businessman and software engineer (1979–2023)

- Born: December 20, 1979; St. Louis, Missouri, U.S.
- Died: April 4, 2023 (aged 43); San Francisco, California, U.S.
- Cause of death: Homicide by stabbing
- Education: Southeast Missouri State University
- Occupations: Businessman; software engineer
- Organizations: Cash App; Square Inc.; MobileCoin
- Known for: Founding Cash App
- Spouse: Krista Lee (separated)
- Children: 2

Bob Lee (December 20, 1979 – April 4, 2023) was an American businessman and software engineer who was best known for helping to create the financial service Cash App. He was the chief technology officer of Square and the chief product officer of MobileCoin.

On April 4, 2023, Lee was fatally stabbed in the Rincon Hill neighborhood of San Francisco. The San Francisco Police Department arrested Nima Momeni for Lee's killing on April 13, 2023, and Momeni was found guilty of second-degree murder on December 17, 2024. In November 2026 Momeni was sentenced to 16 years to life in prison for the death of Bob Lee.

== Early life and career ==
Lee was born in St. Louis, Missouri, on December 20, 1979. Tim Oliver Lee is his brother. While attending Lindbergh High School, Lee wrote a 3D rendering engine in Turbo Pascal, and became known as "Crazy Bob" for his exuberant energy in playing water polo. Lee attended Southeast Missouri State University and pledged the Sigma Chi fraternity.

On August 7, 2001, Lee released a free program to defend Microsoft IIS servers from Code Red, which was at the time a rapidly spreading computer worm. Lee worked for Southeast Missouri State University as a web developer. By 2003, Lee was employed as a technical architect at AT&T. While at AT&T, Lee developed the aspect-oriented programming (AOP) framework dynaop similar to the Spring Framework for Java, featured in Oracle Magazine.

Lee was employed at Google as a staff software engineer from October 2004 to January 2010 and helped develop the Android mobile operating system. Lee co-authored the dependency injection framework Guice with Kevin Bourrillion in 2006 while at Google to modularize AdWords. Lee developed Guice based on ideas he had for Apache Struts, which he concurrently worked on. In 2008, Lee and Bourrillion were awarded the Jolt Award for their work on Guice. Lee transferred to the core libraries team in 2007, eventually leading the team. In May 2009, Lee created a Java dependency injection proposal with Rod Johnson. He was also part of the expert group for a Java proposal that added lambda expressions, as well as another proposal to add concurrency to the language. Additionally, Lee worked on Dalvik, an Android process virtual machine. During Oracle v. Google, Lee was called as a witness.

In January 2010, the e-commerce company Square recruited Lee. He became the company's chief technology officer and led development on the company's Android app, eventually taking over development on Square's iOS app from now-deceased co-founder Tristan O'Tierney. After becoming the chief technology officer, Lee moved to San Francisco from his St. Louis, Missouri home. In 2013, he helped Square build Cash App, then Square Cash. He left Square in 2014, investing in several tech startups, including Clubhouse, SpaceX, and Figma. During the COVID-19 pandemic, Lee assisted the World Health Organization with its app. In 2021, he joined the cryptocurrency payment firm MobileCoin as its chief product officer.

== Personal life ==
Lee had polydactyly, and had surgery to remove his extra fingers.

In 2019, following the death of Lee's mother, his father moved to Mill Valley, California, to live with Lee's family. In 2019, Lee and his wife, Krista, separated. The couple had two children together. In October 2022, Krista and Lee's two children stayed in the Bay Area when Lee moved to Miami to live with his father.

== Murder and trial ==
In the early morning of April 4, 2023, Lee was stabbed in the chest and hip while he was on the 300 block of Main Street in the Rincon Hill neighborhood of San Francisco. Police were called to the scene at 2:35 a.m. local time. CCTV footage shows a wounded Lee stumbling to a parked car that had its hazard lights on, and lifting his shirt to show his wound; the car immediately drove away, after which Lee collapsed on the ground. He had been stabbed in the hip and heart, and had called 911 begging for help. By the time police arrived on the scene, he was unconscious. He was taken to a local hospital where he died from his injuries at the age of 43.

His autopsy report released by the San Francisco medical examiner's office showed that he suffered knife wounds to his heart and lung. The autopsy also revealed evidence of alcohol, cocaine, and ketamine consumption in Lee's system.

On April 13, the San Francisco Police Department (SFPD) arrested 38-year-old Nima Momeni of Emeryville (born August 1984) for the murder of Lee. Momeni was born in Tehran, Iran. At the age of 14, Nima, along with his mother and sister, fled to the United States to get away from their abusive father in 1999. He had been working in the technology industry since 2005, ran a struggling IT consulting firm, and allegedly knew Lee. Surveillance video showed that the morning of the murder, Lee and Momeni left the Millennium Tower condo of Momeni's sister Khazar Momeni around 2 a.m., got into Momeni’s BMW, and then later got out of the car in an isolated area by the Bay Bridge.

On May 14, 2023, The Wall Street Journal reported that Lee and Khazar Elyassnia (Momeni's sister) had a "casual sexual relationship" despite her being married. It also reported that Lee had dated Momeni's ex-girlfriend three years before Lee's murder. At trial Nima Momeni testified that his sister had an open marriage with her plastic surgeon husband. Hours before Lee's murder, Momeni had confronted Lee about whether or not his sister was doing drugs or anything else with Lee that Momeni considered inappropriate due to Elyassnia's marriage. Lee had attended several house parties with Elyassnia before his murder, and had taken several drugs with her prior to his murder. Elyassnia was also arrested for driving under the influence, but the charges were later dismissed. At trial, SFPD Sergeant Dittmer testified that Dr. Elyassnia had googled "How to erase an iPhone" days after Lee's murder, and deleted the search results, and that SFPD was never able to see what was on Khazar Momeni's phones.

On December 17, 2024, Momeni, now 40, was found guilty of second-degree murder after a seven-day deliberation. Randall Knox, an attorney who briefly represented Momeni's mother, Mahnaz Tayarani Babai, said that the jury had a lot to consider. Tayarani then later spoke to the cameras on both KNTV and KGO-TV shortly after the verdict saying that her son was the kindest and had never done anything wrong before the murder despite him having a history of drug abuse. Momeni faces 16 years to life in prison for murdering Lee.

As of December 2025 Nima Momeni has filed a lawsuit accusing media outlets of defamation related to the case.

In November 2026 Nima Momeni was sentenced to 16 years to life in prison for the second-degree murder of Bob Lee.

== Publications ==
- Tate, Bruce; Clark, Mike; Lee, Bob (2003). Bitter EJB. Shelter Island: Manning Publications. ISBN 9781930110953.
