= Robert Zeidman =

American electrical engineer (born 1960)

Bob Zeidman
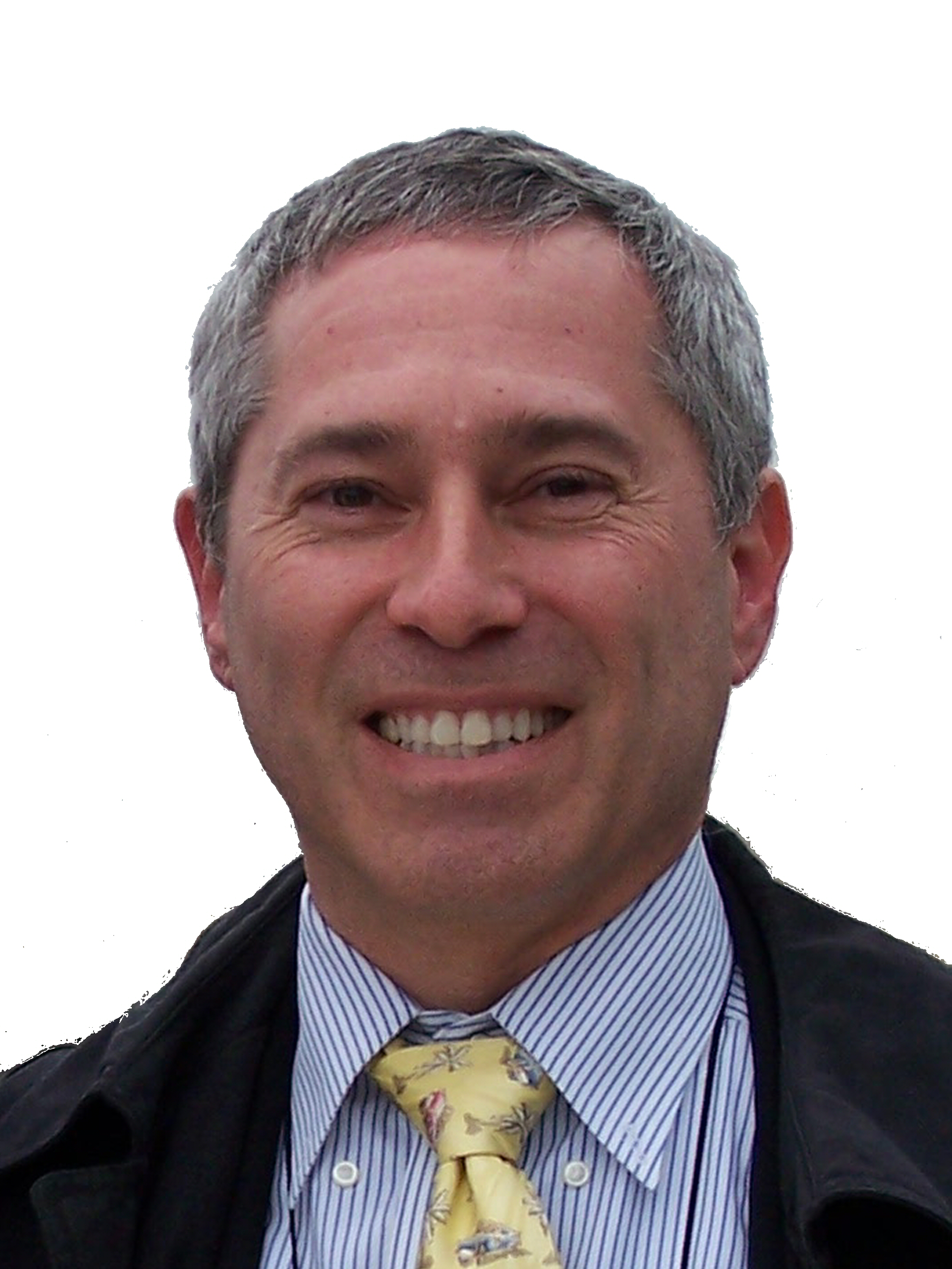
- Zeidman in 2009
- Born: January 18, 1960 (age 66)
- Education: Cornell University (BS); Stanford University (MS)
- Political party: Republican

Robert Zeidman (born January 18, 1960) is an American electrical engineer and inventor. He rose to national attention in the USA after a private arbitration panel in April, 2023 ruled that Zeidman had proved material provided by Mike Lindell was not data from the 2020 United States presidential election. As such it could not be evidence of Chinese electoral interference.

In his professional career, Zeidman has made contributions in Application Specific Integrated Circuit (ASIC) design, Field Programmable Gate Array (FPGA) design, embedded systems development, software synthesis, software analysis and software forensics. Best known for his pioneering contributions to the field of software forensics, Zeidman's research and development of software-forensics tools was instrumental in making detection of software source-code correlation practical and accurate, and in turning previously subjective information into empirical evidence.

Zeidman is a senior member of the IEEE and was the recipient of the 1994 Wyle/EE Times American by Design Award, the 2003 Jolt Reader's Choice Award, the 2010 and the 2015 Outstanding Engineer Award from the IEEE Santa Clara Valley Section and from the Region 6 Central Area.

== Early life and education ==
Zeidman was born and raised in Philadelphia, Pennsylvania. He earned bachelor's degrees in electrical engineering and physics from Cornell University in 1981 and a master's degree in electrical engineering from Stanford University in 1982. Zeidman is married to Carrie. They left California for Summerlin, Nevada in 2019. The Zeidmans are Jewish.

== Technology career ==
In October 1987, Zeidman founded the company Zeidman Consulting, which provides hardware and software design services, engineering support and expert witnesses for high-tech litigation. The company still operates with Zeidman as president. Zeidman's work there includes creating patented Molasses virtualization software that enables a slow speed hardware emulator or prototype to be attached to a high-speed network in order to emulate network hardware in a live system. Zeidman also consulted on court cases in disputed intellectual property, including Brocade v. A10 Networks, for which he testified at trial, ConnectU v. Facebook (on which the movie, The Social Network, is based), and Texas Instruments v. Samsung Electronics, which resulted in an award to his client of over $1 billion. Zeidman also developed the software tools, SynthOS and CodeSuite.

In January 1992, Zeidman invented remote backup and founded the company eVault Remote Backup Service. The company closed in April 1999 and the intellectual property became part of EVault, which was sold to Seagate Technology in 2007.

In January 1999, Zeidman founded The Chalkboard Network, which he ran as president until December, 2002. The company featured business and engineering courses.

In December 2002, Zeidman founded Zeidman Technologies, which provides software tools for embedded software development. The company's patented product SynthOS software automatically synthesizes optimized source code for a custom real time operating system. The company operates with Zeidman as president.

In September 2007, Zeidman founded Software Analysis and Forensic Engineering Corporation, which provides software tools for intellectual property litigation. The company's main product is CodeSuite. The company operates with Zeidman as president.

In January 2011, Zeidman founded SamAnna Designs, which makes practical accessories. Its first product is the SamAnna Luxury Wallet.

In June 2012, Zeidman founded Swiss Creek Publications, an independent publisher, which published Zeidman's books: Introduction to Verilog, Just Enough Electronics to Impress Your Friends and Colleagues, The Amazing Adventure of Edward and Dr. Sprechtmachen, Horror Flick, and Good Intentions.

In December 2013, Zeidman founded Firtiva, a video-on-demand website to provide commercial-free content while sending second screen advertisements to a highly targeted audience.

== Lindell challenge ==
For three days ending August 12, 2021, election conspiracy theorist Mike Lindell hosted a "Cyber Symposium" with the "Prove Mike Wrong Challenge" where he defied attendees to prove that his dataset was not authentic 2020 election data.

Zeidman found that what Lindell had claimed were pcap files ("packet captures" archiving internet traffic) were just encrypted PDF and text files. Among the material was a flow chart of how elections work, a list of IP addresses, and a stream of random numbers and letters. He also found that much of the material had a file creation date from shortly before the symposium, precluding it from being from the election held almost nine months before. Zeidman submitted his findings in a 15-page report to the officials running the challenge. Six weeks after the challenge ended he sent a claim to Lindell Management (the only expert to do so) and was promptly denied. A month later he filed for arbitration.

On April 20, 2023, a panel of the American Arbitration Association Commercial Arbitration Tribunal ruled that Lindell must pay Zeidman $5 million because he had sufficiently proven that Lindell's materials were not authentic 2020 election data. Zeidman agreed to withdraw his other claims that Lindell's rules were unconscionable and that he had violated the Minnesota Consumer Fraud Act on condition of payment.

Zeidman is a conservative Republican and a Donald Trump supporter who voted for him twice. He told reporters "I've made the argument that Lindell is hurting Trump much more than he's helping him because everything Lindell is presenting is so obviously bogus that it just makes any talk about voter fraud or voter integrity look silly." He did not rule out voting for Trump a third time, but invoked the ongoing Republican primary race and said, "I hope I have another choice in the upcoming election." Lindell told reporters he rejects the arbitration panel's finding saying, "It's going to end up in court. I'm not going to pay anything. ...He didn't prove anything." At the time of the arbitration panel's ruling Lindell was being sued for defamation by Dominion Voting Systems (for $1.3 billion) and separately by one of their former executives.

On February 21, 2024, U.S. District Court Judge John R. Tuneheim confirmed the arbitration decision in the District Court of Minnesota, and ruled that Lindell Management LLC (the official defendant in the case) had 30 days to pay Zeidman $5 Million (plus interest). Lindell Management filed an appeal in the 8th Circuit of the U.S. Court of Appeals on March 22, 2024. As of August, 2024, the case is still pending.

Zeidman told reporters he had plans to donate the money to non-profits committed to election security and intended to write a book about the experience.

The Eighth Circuit Court of Appeals reversed the decision of the district court in a 23 July 2025 opinion. The appeals court ruled that the arbitration panel had exceeded its authority when it created a new obligation that the data provided by Lindell must be in the form of PCAP data. The panel reasoned that data "related to the November 2020 election" must be in the form of PCAP data. This restriction was not in the original contract, but was determined by reviewing extrinsic factors, such as claims made by Lindell leading up to the Cyber Symposium. Extrinsic factors are not to be considered when both parties agree that the contract is unambiguous. Because the panel effectively and impermissibly amended the terms of the contract, the appeals court remanded the case back to the district court with instructions to vacate the arbitration award or for further proceedings consistent with the opinion.

== Awards ==
- 1994 Wyle/EE Times American by Design Award
- 2003 Jolt Reader's Choice Award
- 2010 Outstanding Engineer Award from the IEEE Santa Clara Valley Section
- 2015 Outstanding Engineer Award from the IEEE Santa Clara Valley Section and from the Region 6 Central Area for his pioneering contributions to the field of software forensics.

== Books ==
- Zeidman, Bob (2000). Introduction to Verilog (1st ed.). ISBN 0970227639.
- Zeidman, Bob (1999). Verilog Designer's Library (1st ed.). ISBN 0130811548.
- Zeidman, Bob (2000). Designing with FPGAs and CPLDs (1st ed.). ISBN 1578201128.
- Zeidman, Bob (2008). Circuit Design: Know it All (Newnes Know it All) (1st ed.). ISBN 978-1856175272.
- Zeidman, Bob (2009). FPGAs: World Class Designs (1st ed.). ISBN 978-1856176217.
- Zeidman, Bob (2011). The Software IP Detective's Handbook (1st ed.). ASIN B0050H3VPY.
- Zeidman, Bob (2013). Just Enough Electronics to Impress Your Friends and Colleagues (1st ed.). ISBN 978-0970227645.
