= Monero =

Privacy-focused cryptocurrency

Denominations
- Plural: moneroj
- Code: XMR

Development
- Original author: Nicolas van Saberhagen
- White paper: "CryptoNote v 2.0"
- Initial release: 18 April 2014 (12 years ago)
- Latest release: 0.18.5.4 / 16 October 2026 (32 days ago)
- Code repository: github.com/monero-project/
- Development status: Active
- Project fork of: Bytecoin (Note: Source code fork shouldn't be confused with hard forks or soft forks.)
- Written in: C++
- Operating system: Linux, Windows, macOS, Android, FreeBSD
- Source model: FOSS
- License: MIT License

Ledger
- Timestamping scheme: Proof-of-work
- Hash function: RandomX
- Block reward: XMR 0.6 ≥
- Block time: 2 minutes
- Circulating supply: >18,821,206 (2026-10-23)
- Supply limit: Unlimited

Website
- Website: getmonero.org

Monero (/məˈnɛroʊ/; abbreviation: XMR) is a blockchain-based cryptocurrency which is private, untraceable, fungible, and decentralized.

The protocol is open source and based on CryptoNote v2, a concept described in a 2013 white paper authored by Nicolas van Saberhagen. Developers used this concept to design Monero, and deployed its mainnet in 2014. The Monero protocol includes various methods to obfuscate transaction details, though users can optionally share view keys for third-party auditing. Transactions are validated through a miner network running RandomX, a proof-of-work algorithm. The algorithm issues new coins to miners and was designed to be resistant against application-specific integrated circuit (ASIC) mining.

Monero's privacy features have attracted cypherpunks and users desiring privacy measures not provided in other cryptocurrencies. A 2022 study in FSI Digital Investigations concluded "For now, Monero is untraceable. However, it is probably only a matter of time and effort before it changes." Due to its perceived untraceability Monero is gaining increased use in illicit activities such as money laundering, darknet markets, ransomware, cryptojacking, and other organized crime.

== Background ==
Monero's roots trace back to CryptoNote v2, a cryptocurrency protocol first introduced in a white paper published by the presumed pseudonymous Nicolas van Saberhagen in October 2013. In the paper, the author described privacy and anonymity as "the most important aspects of electronic cash" and characterized bitcoin's traceability as a "critical flaw". A Bitcointalk forum user known as "thankful_for_today" implemented these ideas into a coin they called BitMonero. However, other forum users disagreed with thankful_for_today's direction for BitMonero and decided to fork it in 2014, leading to the creation of Monero. Monero translates to coin in Esperanto. The plural of monero ("moneroj") is likewise formed using Esperanto grammar. Both van Saberhagen and thankful_for_today remain anonymous.

Monero has the third-largest community of developers, behind bitcoin and Ethereum. The protocol's lead maintainer was previously South African developer Riccardo Spagni. Much of the core development team chooses to remain anonymous.

== Privacy ==
Ring signatures create ambiguity in blockchain analysis.

Monero's key features are those around privacy and anonymity. Even though it is a public and decentralized ledger, all transaction details are obfuscated. This contrasts to bitcoin, where all transaction details, user addresses, and wallet balances are public and transparent. These features have given Monero a loyal following among crypto anarchists, cypherpunks, and privacy advocates.

The transaction outputs, or notes, of users sending Monero are obfuscated through ring signatures, which groups a sender's outputs with other decoy outputs. Encryption of transaction amounts began in 2017 with the implementation of ring confidential transactions (RingCTs). Developers also implemented a zero-knowledge proof method, "Bulletproofs", which guarantee a transaction occurred without revealing its value. Monero recipients are protected through "stealth addresses", public keys generated by the sender that are untraceable to the receiver by a network observer. These privacy features are enforced on the network by default.

Monero uses Dandelion++, a protocol which obscures the IP address of devices producing transactions. This is done through a method of transaction broadcast propagation; new transactions are initially passed to one node on Monero's peer-to-peer network, and a repeated probabilistic method is used to determine when the transaction should be sent to just one node or broadcast to many nodes in a process called flooding.

=== Transaction tracing research ===
In April 2017, researchers highlighted three major threats to Monero users' privacy. The first relies on leveraging the ring signature size of zero, and ability to see the output amounts. The second, "Leveraging Output Merging", involves tracking transactions where two outputs belong to the same user, such as when they send funds to themselves ("churning"). Finally, "Temporal Analysis", shows that predicting the right output in a ring signature could potentially be easier than previously thought. In 2018, researchers presented possible vulnerabilities in a paper titled "An Empirical Analysis of Traceability in the Monero Blockchain".

In September 2020, the United States Internal Revenue Service's criminal investigation division (IRS-CI), posted a $625,000 bounty for contractors who could develop tools to help trace Monero, other privacy-enhanced cryptocurrencies, the Bitcoin Lightning Network, or other "layer 2" protocol. The contract was awarded to blockchain analysis groups Chainalysis and Integra FEC.

In 2021, researchers presented a transaction-flooding attack against Monero’s transaction-graph privacy at the IEEE International Conference on Blockchain and Cryptocurrency. Under specific assumptions about transaction structure and fees, the "FloodXMR" attack modelled how an adversary who floods the blockchain with their own transactions could, over time, deanonymize a substantial fraction of new transaction inputs at relatively low cost.

== Mining ==
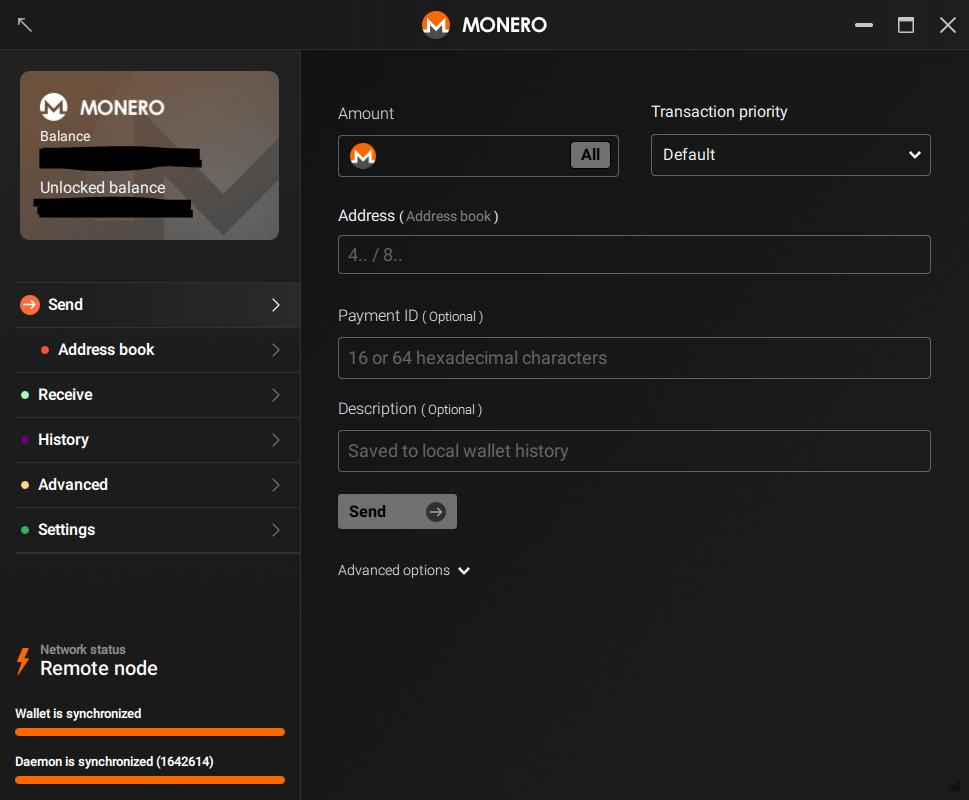
Monero GUI running on a remote node

Monero uses a proof-of-work algorithm, RandomX, to validate transactions. The method was introduced in November 2019 to replace the former algorithm CryptoNightR. Both algorithms were designed to be resistant to ASIC mining, which is commonly used to mine other cryptocurrencies such as bitcoin. Monero can be mined somewhat efficiently on consumer-grade hardware such as x86, x86-64, ARM and GPUs, a design decision which was based on Monero project's opposition to mining centralisation which ASIC mining creates, but has also resulted in Monero's popularity among malware-based non-consensual miners.

== Use ==
Monero's privacy features have made it popular for illicit purposes.

=== Darknet markets ===
Monero is a common medium of exchange on darknet markets.

In August 2016, dark market AlphaBay permitted its vendors to start accepting Monero as an alternative to bitcoin. The site was taken offline by law enforcement in 2017, but it was relaunched in 2021 with Monero as the sole permitted currency.

A 2024 report covered by Wired found that vendors of child sexual abuse material increasingly used Monero for laundering proceeds through instant exchangers, with blockchain analysis firm Chainalysis describing Monero as "the currency of choice" for this purpose.

The United States Department of Justice and the Treasury Department have identified Monero as a frequently used tool in darknet and ransomware-related money laundering, with sanctioned exchangers processing hundreds of millions of dollars in XMR.

=== Mining malware ===
In late 2017, malware and antivirus service providers blocked Coinhive, a JavaScript implementation of a Monero miner that was embedded in websites and apps, in some cases by hackers. Coinhive wrote the script as an alternative to advertisements; a website or app could embed it, and use website visitors' CPU to mine the cryptocurrency while the visitor is consuming the content of the webpage, with the site or app owner getting a percentage of the mined coins. Some websites and apps did this without informing visitors, or in some cases using all possible system resources. As a result, the script was blocked by companies offering ad blocking subscription lists, antivirus services, and antimalware services. Coinhive had been previously found hidden in Showtime-owned streaming platforms and Starbucks Wi-Fi hotspots in Argentina. Researchers in 2018 found similar malware that mined Monero and sent it to Kim Il-sung University in North Korea.

=== Ransomware ===
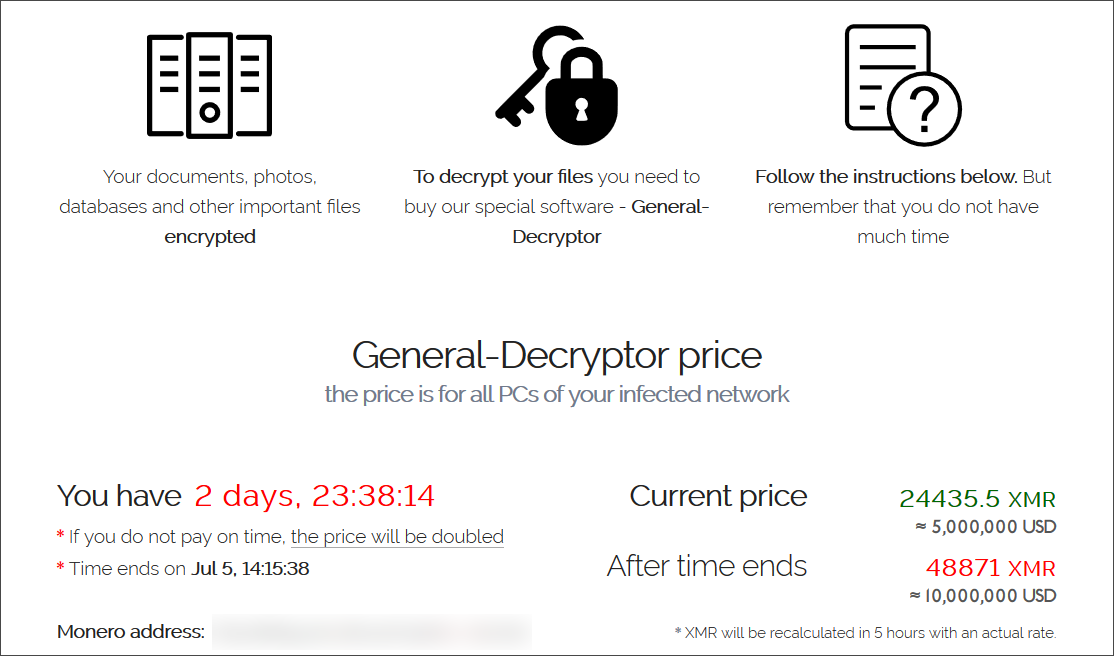
Ransomware deployed in 2021 by REvil. The hackers are demanding payment in Monero.

Monero is sometimes used by ransomware groups. According to CNBC, in the first half of 2018, Monero was used in 44% of cryptocurrency ransomware attacks.

The perpetrators of the 2017 WannaCry ransomware attack, which was attributed by the US government to North Korean threat actors, attempted to exchange the ransom they collected in Bitcoin to Monero. Ars Technica and Fast Company reported that the exchange was successful, but BBC News reported that the service the criminals attempted to use, ShapeShift, denied any such transfer. The Shadow Brokers, who leaked the exploits which were subsequently used in WannaCry but are unlikely to have been involved in the attack, began accepting Monero as payment later in 2017.

In 2021, CNBC, the Financial Times, and Newsweek reported that demand for Monero was increasing following the recovery of a bitcoin ransom paid in the Colonial Pipeline cyber attack. The May 2021 hack forced the pipeline to pay a $4.4M ransom in bitcoin, though a large portion was recovered by the United States federal government the following month. The group behind the attack, DarkSide, normally requests payment in either bitcoin or Monero, but charge a 10–20% premium for payments made in bitcoin due to its increased traceability risk. Ransomware group REvil removed the option of paying ransom in bitcoin in 2021, demanding only Monero. Ransomware negotiators, groups that help victims pay ransoms, have contacted Monero developers to understand the technology. Despite this, CNBC reported that bitcoin was still the currency of choice demanded in most ransomware attacks, as insurers refuse to pay Monero ransom payments because of traceability concerns.

=== Regulatory responses ===
The attribution of Monero to illicit markets has influenced some exchanges to forgo listing it. This has made it more difficult for users to exchange Monero for fiat currencies or other cryptocurrencies. Exchanges in South Korea and Australia have delisted Monero and other privacy coins due to regulatory pressure.

After many online payment platforms shut down access for white nationalists following the Unite the Right rally in 2017, some of them, including Christopher Cantwell and Andrew Auernheimer ("weev"), started using and promoting Monero.

In 2018, Europol and its director Rob Wainwright wrote that the year would see criminals shift from using bitcoin to using Monero, as well as Ethereum, Dash, and Zcash. Bloomberg and CNN reported that this demand for Monero was because authorities were becoming better at monitoring the Bitcoin blockchain.

On 20 February 2024, the cryptocurrency exchange Binance delisted Monero, citing regulatory compliance.

The United States Internal Revenue Service (IRS) has offered funding for contractors that can develop Monero tracing technologies.

== See also ==
- Cryptocurrency exchange
- Legality of cryptocurrency by country or territory
- List of cryptocurrencies
