= Elette Boyle =

American and Israeli computer scientist and cryptographer

- אלט בויל
- Born: Yamhill, Oregon, United States
- Education: California Institute of Technology; Massachusetts Institute of Technology
- Scientific career
- Fields: Secret sharing Digital signatures Obfuscation
- Workplaces: Interdisciplinary Center Herzliya; Technion – Israel Institute of Technology

Elette Boyle (Hebrew: אלט בויל) is an American computer scientist and cryptographer, known for her research on secret sharing, digital signatures, and obfuscation. She is a professor of computer science at the Interdisciplinary Center Herzliya, where she directs the Center for Foundations and Applications of Cryptographic Theory.

== Education and career ==
Boyle is originally from Yamhill, Oregon. She studied mathematics at the California Institute of Technology, competed for Caltech in the high jump, and was named Caltech's female scholar-athlete of the year for 2007–2008.

After graduating in 2008, she completed her Ph.D. at the Massachusetts Institute of Technology, under the joint supervision of Shafi Goldwasser and Yael Tauman Kalai. Before joining the IDC Herzliya faculty, she was a postdoctoral researcher at the Technion – Israel Institute of Technology and at Cornell University.

== Recognition ==
A paper by Boyle on secret sharing using homomorphic encryption was given the best paper award at the 2016 International Cryptology Conference (Crypto). She was an invited plenary speaker at Public Key Cryptography 2018.
