= Steve Jurvetson =

American entrepreneur and venture capitalist

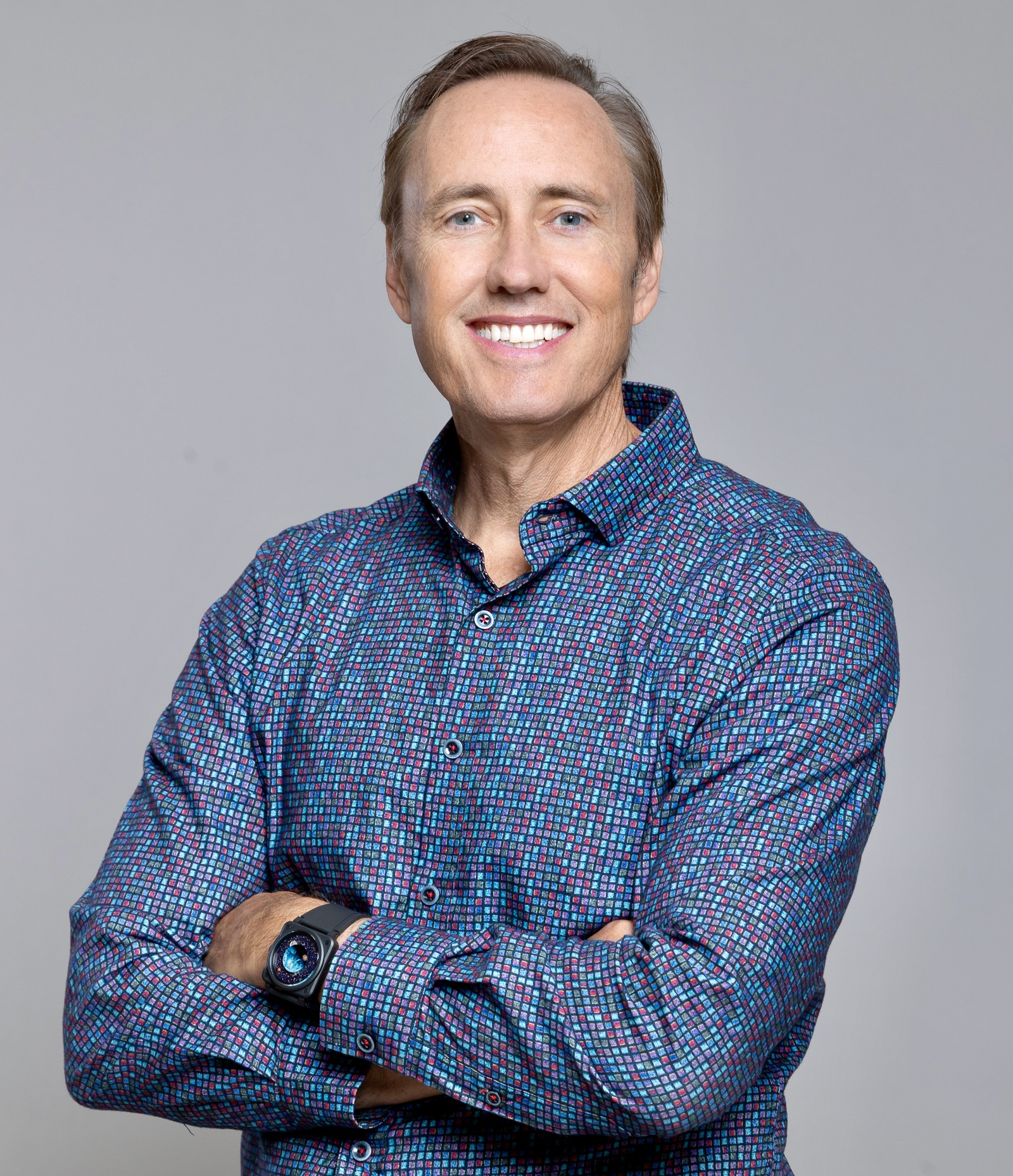
- Jurvetson in 2025
- Born: Stephen T. Jurvetson; March 1, 1967 (age 59); Arizona, U.S.
- Education: Stanford University (BS, MS, MBA)
- Occupations: Founder and managing director, Draper Fisher Jurvetson; Co-founder, Future Ventures
- Spouse: Karla Jurvetson (m. 1990; div. 2018) Genevieve Jurvetson (m. 2018)
- Children: 5

Stephen T. Jurvetson (born March 1, 1967) is an American businessman and venture capitalist. Formerly a partner of the firm Draper Fisher Jurvetson (DFJ), he was an early investor in Hotmail, Memphis Meats, Mythic, Zyphra, and Nervana Systems. He is currently a board member of SpaceX among others. He later cofounded the firm Future Ventures with Maryanna Saenko, who worked with him at DFJ.

Jurvetson was named to Forbes' "Midas List" of Tech's Top Investors in 2011, 2012, 2013, 2014, and 2016.

He was a board member of Synthetic Genomics, Planet Labs, MobileCoin, Nervana Systems (acquired by Intel), Flux, D-Wave, SpaceX, and Tesla. Jurvetson was a member of the Tesla board of directors from 2006 to December 2020.

== Early life and education ==
Jurvetson's father Tõnu Jürvetson fled Estonia through Germany just before Soviet reoccupation in 1944. Tõnu was married to another Estonian immigrant, Tiiu Tia Jürvetson. Although his parents spoke the Estonian language at home, Steve never learned it, so his parents used it as a secret language between themselves. Steve Jurvetson was the first US-born Estonian to become an e-resident of Estonia.

Jurvetson grew up in Dallas, where he graduated from St. Mark's School of Texas in 1985. At Stanford University, Jurvetson finished his degree in electrical engineering in 2.5 years. He then earned an M.S. in electrical engineering and an M.B.A., also from Stanford. His first job out of Stanford was working as an R&D engineer at Hewlett-Packard (HP). After two years at HP, he moved on as a product marketer at Apple and then NeXT Software.

Jurvetson was named to the MIT Technology Review Innovators Under 35 in 1999 to "recognize young entrepreneurs who can deliver", including making the first investment in Hotmail.

== Career ==
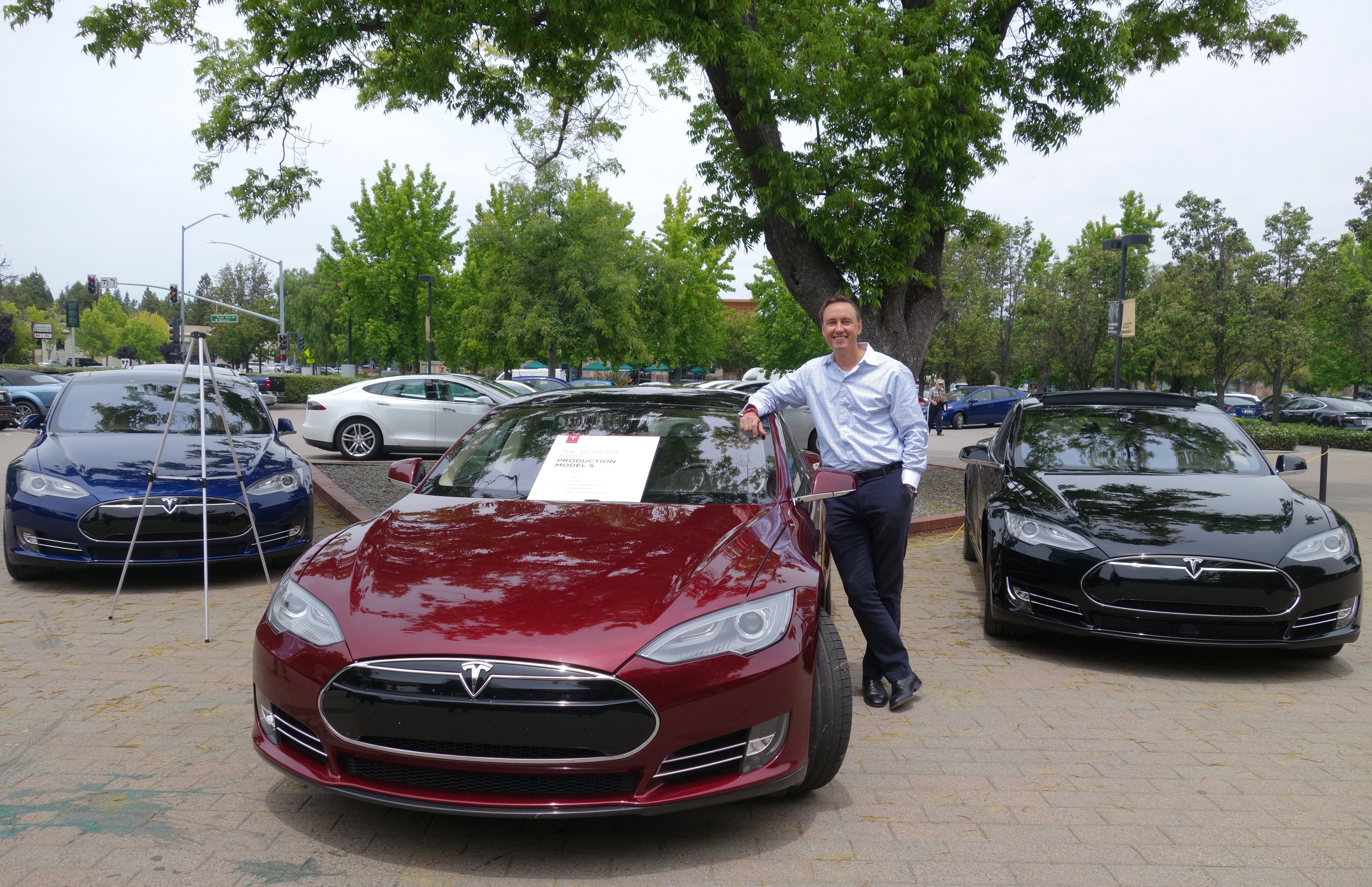
Jurvetson with the first production Tesla Model S in 2015

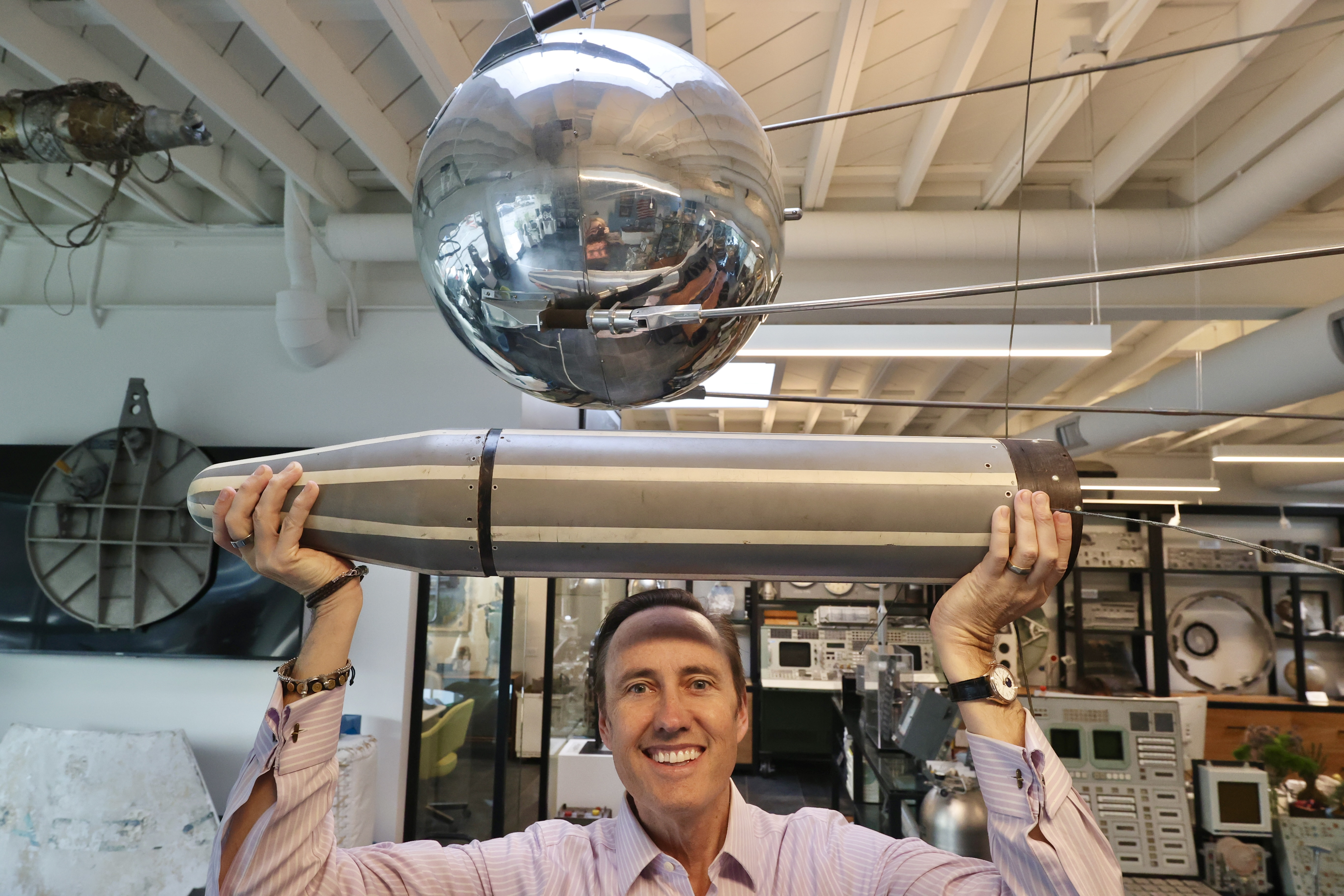
Jurvetson with Explorer 1 and Sputnik, from his collection of space artifacts

As a consultant with Bain & Company, Jurvetson developed marketing, sales, engineering, and business strategies for a wide range of companies in the software, networking, and semiconductor industries. He first joined DFJ after his second year of business school, and became a partner after proving his talent on several investments.

At DFJ, Jurvetson was involved in lucrative investments with Hotmail, the Chinese company Baidu, Skype, Interwoven, Kana, Tradex, and Cyras. Cyras in particular was acquired for US$8 billion. Less favorably, DFJ and Jurvetson were an early financial backer of Elizabeth Holmes and the disgraced blood-testing firm Theranos.

Also in 2016, President Barack Obama appointed Jurvetson as a Presidential Ambassador for Global Entrepreneurship.

=== Departure from DFJ and sexual harassment allegations ===
On November 13, 2017, Jurvetson stepped down from his role at DFJ Venture Capital in addition to taking leave from the boards of SpaceX and Tesla following an internal DFJ investigation into allegations of sexual harassment. While there were allegations of inappropriate behavior, DFJ did not receive an official complaint of harassment or misconduct. While the findings of the investigation were not made public, anonymous sources alleged that the investigation "uncovered behaviors by Jurvetson that were unacceptable related to a negative tone toward women entrepreneurs." Jurvetson stated that stepping down from his role was unrelated to the allegations, writing "I am leaving DFJ to focus on personal matters" in a statement posted to Twitter. Recode reported that Jurvetson was placed on a leave of absence and then later voted out of the company.

=== Current ===
Jurvetson cofounded a new venture fund, Future Ventures, in April 2018. The inaugural $200M venture capital fund focuses on environmentally sustainable transportation, food technology and high power computer systems. Future Ventures closed second and third rounds of funding in January 2021 and April 2023, respectively, each for $200 million.
