= Michael Zeidman =

Michael Zeidman (born Michael Jason Zeidman; March 9, 1985, in New York City) is a singer, actor, pianist and musician. He was also a child actor and an original member of The Broadway Kids. He graduated medical school at Northeast Ohio Medical University in 2013 and is currently completed a general surgery residency at Montefiore Medical Center. He is currently in Fellowship at Mount Sinai in Breast Surgery.

== Film and television work ==
- Mar 12, 1987 - May 18, 2003, Les Misérables (Original musical), Gavroche (replacement)
- Apr 22, 1993 - Jun 17, 1995 The Who's Tommy, Tommy age 10 -(replacement)
- Backfire! (1995 film), Young Jeremy
- Kathie Lee Gifford: We Need a Little Christmas (TV movie 1996), himself, musical guest

== Discography ==
- Jump Up And Sing: Binyah's Favorite Songs CD (1996)
- Sing Christmas CD / Broadway Kids (1997)
- At The Movies CD / Broadway Kids (1997)
