= Jared Tinklenberg =

American psychiatrist

- Other names: Jared R. Tinklenberg
- Children: Karla Jurvetson
- Scientific career
- Fields: Psychiatry
- Institutions: Stanford University School of Medicine; VA Palo Alto Health Care System

Jared R. Tinklenberg was an American professor of psychiatry and behavioral sciences.

== Education ==
Tinklenberg held a Doctor of Medicine degree from the University of Iowa.

== Career ==
Tinklenberg was a professor emeritus of psychiatry and behavioral sciences at Stanford University School of Medicine. He was the Associate Chief of Staff for Mental Health Research and Education at the VA Palo Alto Health Care System. Tinklenberg was a co-principal investigator and co-director of the Stanford/VA California Alzheimer's Disease Center.

=== Research ===
Tinklenberg's areas of research included the psychopharmacology of dementia and Alzheimer's disease.

== Awards and honors ==
Tinklenberg was a Fellow emeritus of the American College of Neuropsychopharmacology. In 2017, to honor Tinklenberg's 50-year career as a medical school professor, his daughter Karla Jurvetson helped fund the construction of the new Stanford Medical Center and endowed the Jared and Mae Tinklenberg Professorship in her parents' names.

== Personal life ==
Tinklenberg was born on November 25, 1939, in South Dakota, the son of a Christian minister who worked for the U.S. Navy. He met his wife, Mae (Van der Weerd) at the University of Iowa while he was in medical school, and they married in 1964. They moved to New Haven, CT for his internship, where their daughter Karla was born in 1966, and then to Palo Alto, where their daughter Julie was born in 1968.

In 2017, in honor of his work at Stanford, his daughters endowed the Jared and Mae Tinklenberg Professorship Chair. Tinklenberg died on November 18, 2020, at age 80.

== Selected works ==
=== Books ===
- Tinklenberg, Jared (1975). Marijuana and Health Hazards: Methodological Issues in Issues in Current Research. Elsevier. ISBN 9780323160490.
