= Murder of Reet Jurvetson =

Estonian-Canadian woman who was murdered in California in November 1969

Reet Jurvetson
- Reet Jurvetson at age 18
- Born: Reet Silvia Jurvetson; September 23, 1950; Sweden
- Disappeared: November 1969; Los Angeles, California, U.S.
- Died: c. November 14, 1969; Los Angeles, California, U.S.
- Cause of death: Homicide by stabbing
- Body discovered: November 16, 1969; Mulholland Drive, Southern California
- Other name: "Jane Doe 59," "Sherry Doe"
- Known for: Formerly unidentified victim of homicide
- Height: 5 ft 9 in (1.75 m) (approximate)

Reet Silvia Jurvetson (Estonian: Jürvetson; September 23, 1950 – c. November 14, 1969) was an Estonian-Canadian woman who was murdered in California in November 1969 at age 19. Her body remained unidentified for 46 years, until an online mortuary photograph was recognized by her family and friends in 2015. Prior to her identification, Jurvetson's body had been informally known as "Sherry Doe" and officially as "Jane Doe 59."

Members of the Manson Family were initially suspected of involvement in Jurvetson's murder, although the Los Angeles Police Department has discounted this possibility, stating the most likely suspect is an unidentified man named "John" or "Jean", whom she had specifically traveled from Canada to meet just weeks prior to her murder.

== Discovery ==
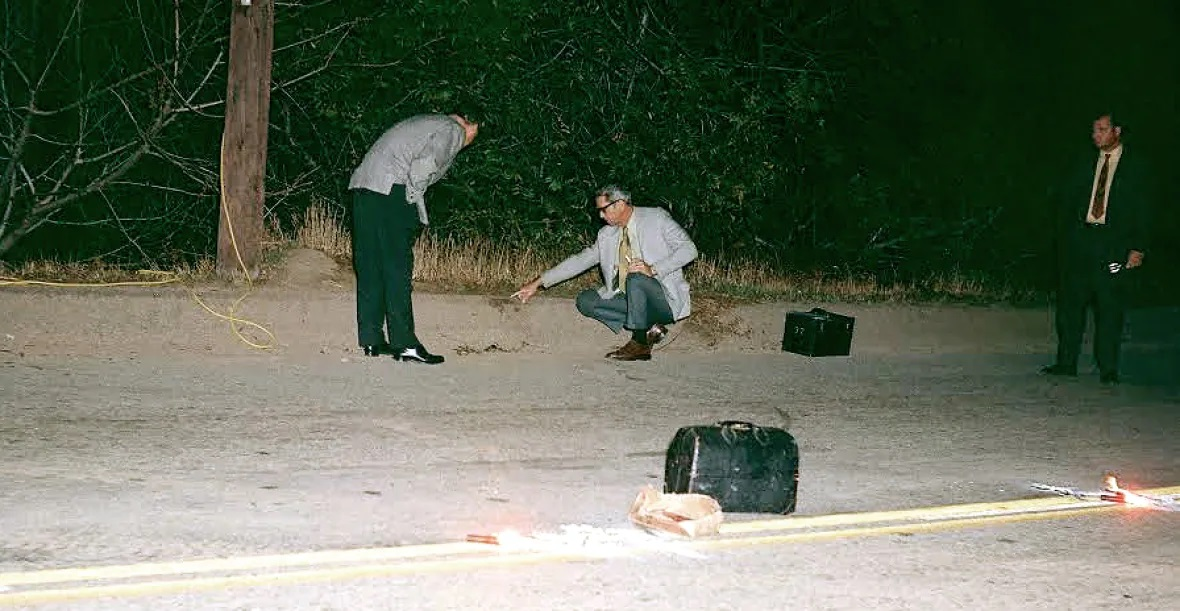
Los Angeles Police officers at the crime scene.

On November 16, 1969, the fully clothed body of a white female was located in a dense bushland off Mulholland Drive in Los Angeles, California by a 15-year-old boy who had been birdwatching. The victim had died of multiple stab wounds—predominantly inflicted to her neck—approximately two days before her body was discovered dumped in the ravine at the side of the drive. A tree branch had prevented her body from rolling fully down the ravine and into a 699-foot-deep (213 m) canyon, and her body lay against this branch just 15 ft (5 m) down the ravine. An autopsy conducted the following morning determined that the victim's body had been discovered within 24 to 48 hours of her murder. (Note: Eleven months prior to the discovery of Jurvetson's body, the body of a 17-year-old girl named Marina Habe had been found a short distance from Mulholland Drive; although detectives within the Los Angeles Police Department have noted "striking similarities" between the method of murder of both women (Habe had died from a multitude of stab wounds to the thorax and neck, with her carotid artery also having been severed), no firm connection between both murders has ever been established.)

In total, the victim had been stabbed 157 times in the neck, chest and torso with a common pen knife; some of these wounds had severed her carotid artery. Defensive wounds were also discovered upon her hands. It is also believed she had been transported to the location where her body was discarded in an upright position, and that her murderer was a right-handed individual. She had not been the victim of a robbery or any form of sexual assault prior to her murder, and had no drugs or alcohol in her system when she died. Furthermore, the victim had been killed approximately two hours after having eaten a meal.

=== Distinguishing characteristics ===
The young woman was initially believed to be between 20 and 23 years old and was 5 ft 9 in tall, weighing 112 pounds. The woman had green eyes, tinted dark brown hair, and had vaccination scars on both her left arm and left thigh. A one-quarter-inch horizontal scar was also visible beneath her left breast, and a birthmark was located upon her right buttock. She had also received several silver amalgam fillings in both her upper and lower jaw. Besides these traits, the victim had no other distinctive features, and she had no identification in her possession at the time of her discovery.

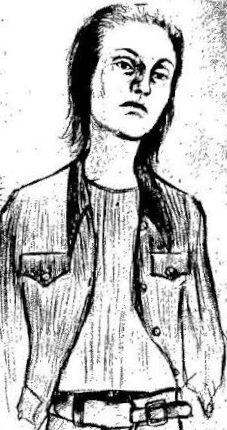
Original police sketch of Jane Doe 59, released to the media shortly after her discovery

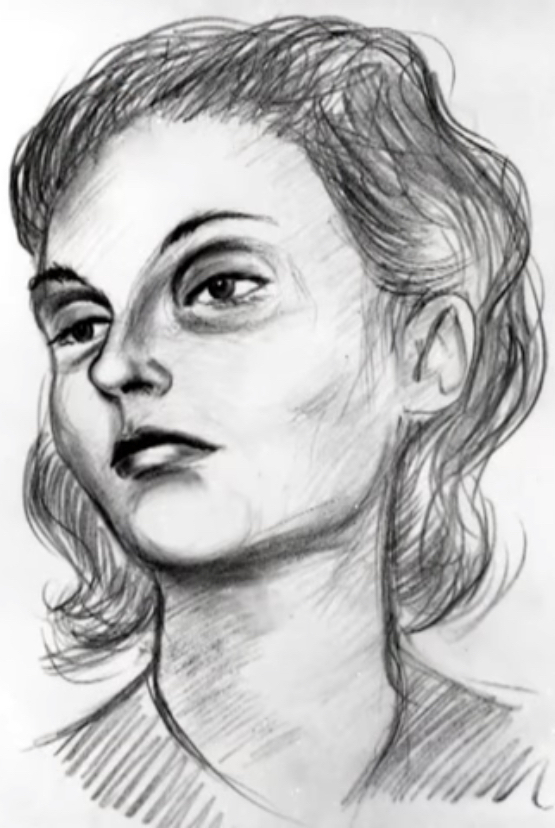
Early postmortem drawing of Jane Doe 59

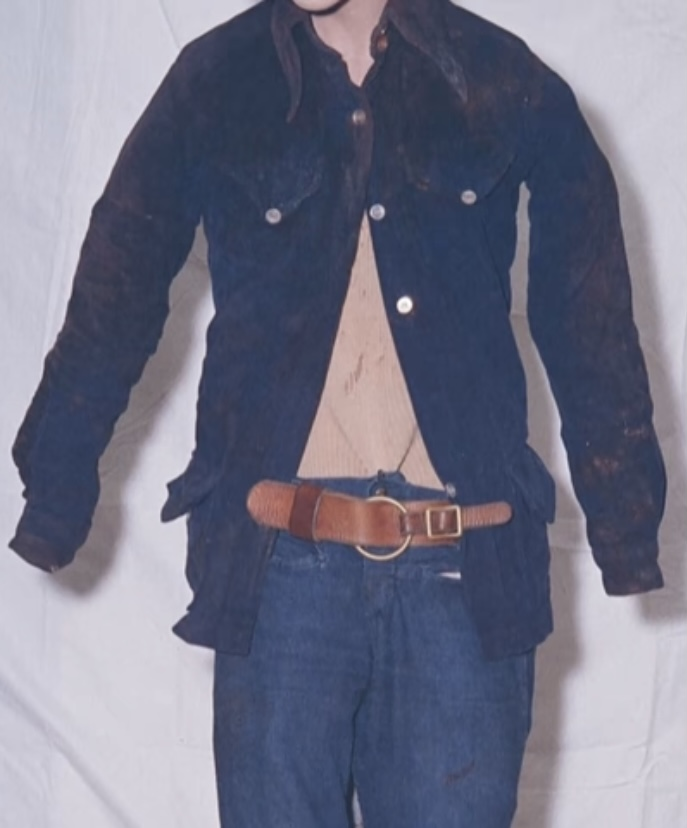
The clothing worn by the decedent

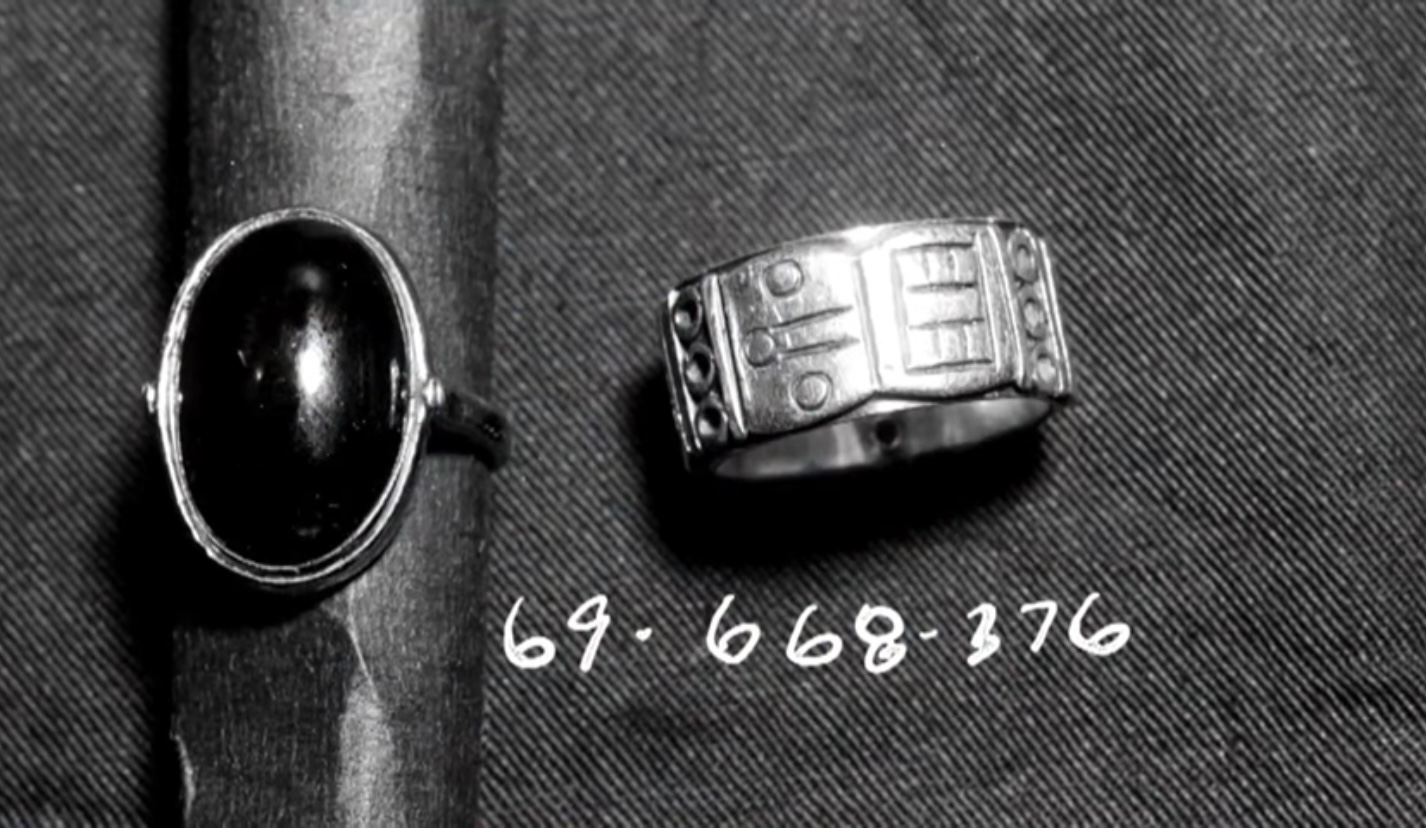
Jewelry found upon the body

== Investigation ==
Evidence discovered at the crime scene suggested the victim's body had been placed in the back seat of a car, then driven to the disposal location, where her body was dragged out of the car and around the trunk of the vehicle, then rolled down the ravine. Furthermore, on November 21, a pair of Liberty brand glasses belonging to a nearsighted individual were found approximately 50 feet (18 m) from the location where the victim's body had been placed in the ravine, although it remains inconclusive whether these glasses are related to the case.

Because several articles of the clothing the victim had worn at the time of her murder had been manufactured outside of America, she was theorized to have been a native of a country such as Spain or Canada, as her boots and jacket were made in these countries, respectively. Other articles of clothing worn by the victim included cut-off shorts from Massachusetts, a leather belt, and a sweater. A buckle on the belt was made of brass and the victim wore two metal rings; one white, and one yellow. The yellow ring contained a red stone, and the white ring bore Native American designs and was manufactured in Mexico.

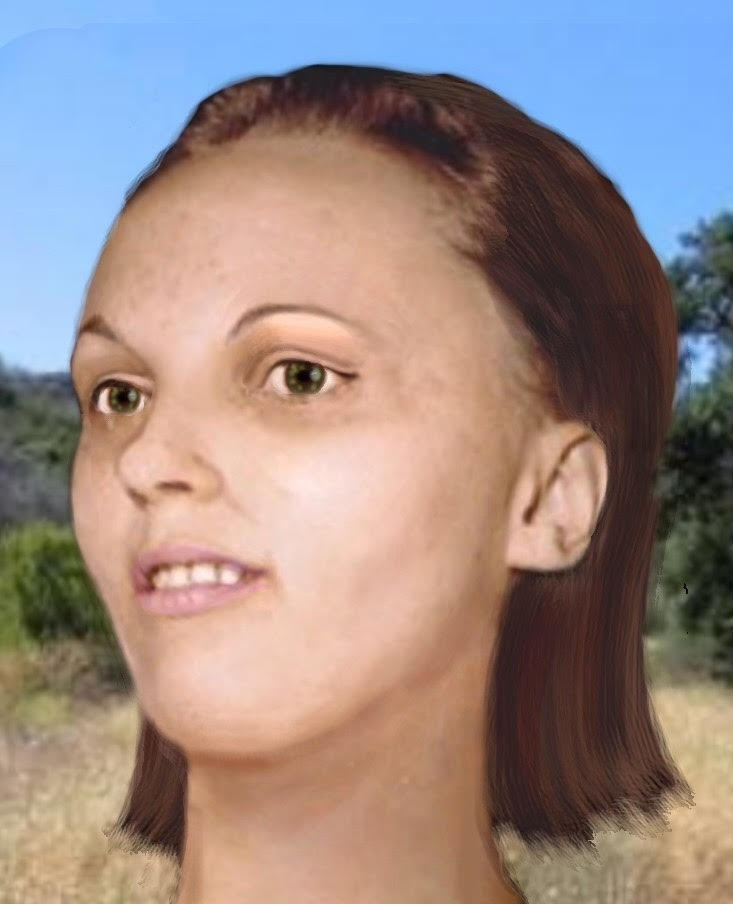
One artistic rendering by Carl Koppelman of the victim, based on a mortuary photograph.

The victim's face was forensically reconstructed to provide an estimation of her appearance in life. Artists created several composite drawings shortly after the victim was found; later drawings were created by Project EDAN member Barbara Martin-Bailey. Jurvetson's sister later criticized all of these works, citing them as being "clearly inaccurate, as anyone can see". She would expound that each reconstruction bore very little representation as to how her sister had appeared in life.

The location of the victim's body and the possibility that she was seen alive in the company of the Manson Family prior to her murder prompted police to suspect their involvement in her murder. Charles Manson was interviewed both before and after the victim's identification but denied any involvement. Nonetheless, a woman closely matching the description of the deceased had been seen days before the victim had been murdered with various inhabitants of Spahn Ranch. The individual who informed police of this fact stated she believed the woman used the name "Sherry." The Manson Family was also suspected to be involved in the case due to the circumstantial fact the location her body was found was approximately six miles from the site where actress Sharon Tate and four other victims had been murdered just three months previous.

== Identification ==
In June 2015, Jurvetson's older sister, Anne, was contacted by friends who had been searching through the National Missing and Unidentified Persons System, and who had noticed a similarity between a contemporary morgue photograph of the then-unidentified woman and Anne Jurvetson's estranged sister. In response to the notification, Anne submitted a DNA sample for comparison to a sample retrieved from a bloodstained bra belonging to the deceased which had been retained and stored, and from which DNA had been obtained.

The next year, in April 2016, a formal announcement was made that the body had been conclusively identified as being that of Reet Silvia Jurvetson, a 19-year-old native of Montreal who had been living in Los Angeles for just weeks prior to her murder.

== Disappearance ==
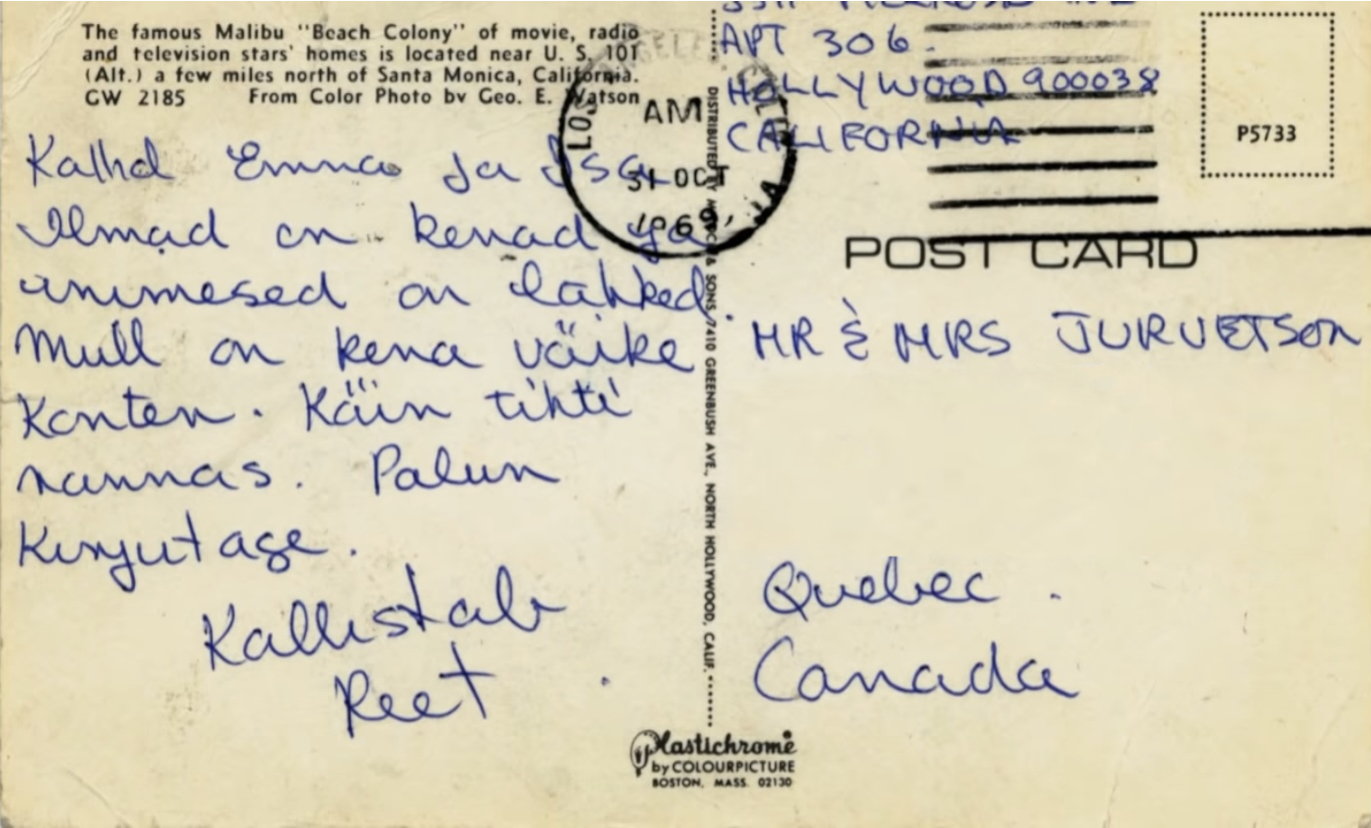
Postcard sent by Jurvetson to her parents in Canada, prior to her death, serving as their final form of communication.

Reet Silvia Jurvetson had departed from her home country of Canada to visit a man named "John" or "Jean" in California in the late summer of 1969. Several weeks after she had arrived (and just two weeks prior to her murder), she wrote a postcard in the Estonian language to her family which described her general satisfaction with her life in Los Angeles, and encouraging her parents to maintain contact with her via correspondence. Another postcard was also sent to her closest friend. These two postcards were the final contact her family and friends ever received from Reet. Her family did not report her missing, as they had known just how adventurous Reet had become in her later teenage years, and presumed she was simply "making a new life for herself". The Jurvetsons had made tentative efforts to contact Reet throughout the years, although all had proven fruitless. Her sister, Anne, would recollect in 2016 that, in addition to the family's hope Reet would contact them as and when she felt the urge to do so: "We did not know how to find someone on the other side of the continent."

Nonetheless, after several weeks had passed without contact from their daughter, her parents did send an individual to the return address upon the postcard, only for this individual to be informed Reet had vacated the apartment several weeks previously. Shortly thereafter, the family hired a private investigator, although this individual was unable to garner any fruitful leads. Despite these setbacks, Reet's sister emphasized the fact that, prior to her being shown the online photographs of her deceased sister, she and her family had never given serious thought to Reet being the victim of a homicide.

=== Persons of interest ===
Following Jurvetson's identification, both her family and cold case detectives named two individuals of significant interest in the case. The first individual is the man with the name "John" or "Jean" with whom Jurvetson had become acquainted when she had worked at a Toronto post office several months prior to her murder. According to both her family and a Los Angeles cold case detective named Luis Rivera, Jurvetson had been absolutely "smitten" by this individual, and had scrupulously saved her earnings through her work at the post office in order that she could travel to meet this individual after he had relocated to California.

"More than likely she was unable to defend herself any other way other than to ... use her hands to either block the attack or actually grab on to the knife, so the way we see it is she was immobilized, probably on her back, and the person might have been on top of her as he was inflicting the wounds."

— Detective Luis Rivera, 2016

The postcards she had sent to her parents and closest friend on October 31 had informed them she was contented, had decided to stay in California, and that she had found an apartment within a four-storey building named the Paramount Hotel. These postcards would prove to be the final correspondence her family and friends ever received from her. Furthermore, Jurvetson is not known to have established any other close acquaintances throughout the relatively short period of time she had lived in Los Angeles prior to her murder beyond this individual and a likely roommate of his, and neither the man she had traveled to meet, nor his roommate had ever filed a missing person report on Jurvetson. Composite sketches of these individuals were created by the Los Angeles Police Department from descriptions created with the cooperation of a witness from Montreal who had known Jurvetson prior to her departure to California. This individual reiterated to investigators the fact that Reet had met "Jean" while she had worked in Toronto, and also stated she had specifically traveled to California to meet with this individual after his own previous departure from Montreal. This witness has also stated this individual had been a medical student who had closely resembled Doors singer and songwriter Jim Morrison. Furthermore, witnesses recall this man had a slight French accent. The second individual considered "of interest" to the Los Angeles Police Department in their investigation into Reet Jurvetson's murder is the first suspect's likely roommate: a man with a Beatles-style haircut, possibly also named "Jean", who is known to have informed a close friend of Reet in the spring of 1970 that he and the first suspect had lived with Reet in Los Angeles the previous year. This individual had claimed Reet had left the two men of her own volition; he had also made brief attempts to assure Reet's close friend she (Reet) had not been in any form of danger when she had left the two men, making a statement to the effect of: "Oh yeah, she was with us for a couple of weeks and then she left on her own and everything's fine. She was happy."

The third individual investigators consider of interest in the case is an individual named M. Lindhorst. This individual had lived across the hall from the apartment where Reet Jurvetson had resided at the time of her murder, and investigators hope he or she will be able to recall the surname of either or both of the two individuals with whom Reet had lived prior to her murder.

== See also ==
- Cold case
- Crime in California
- Forensic facial reconstruction
- List of solved missing person cases (1950–1969)
- The Doe Network
- Unidentified decedent

== Cited works and further reading ==
- Bugliosi, Vincent; Gentry, Curt (1974). Helter Skelter: The True Story of the Manson Murders. London: Arrow Books. pp. 621–622. ISBN 978-1-784-75176-0.
- Cooper, Ian (2018). The Manson Family on Film and Television. North Carolina: McFarland & Company. pp. 6–7. ISBN 978-1-476-67043-0.
