= Cryptocurrency tracing =

Digital forensic technique

Cryptocurrency tracing is a digital forensic technique used to track and analyze the flow of cryptocurrencies across blockchain networks. Law enforcement agencies, regulators, and cybersecurity experts use cryptocurrency tracing to identify and combat fraud.

Cryptocurrencies like Bitcoin and Ethereum use blockchain technology, allowing for "trustless" transactions verified without central intermediaries. Some blockchain networks are transparent and decentralized, providing transaction information specialists can use for tracing purposes. Transparency makes it possible to trace funds across different ledgers, even when criminals try to obscure their origins through techniques like mixing or converting between different cryptocurrencies.

Cryptocurrency tracing techniques include blockchain analysis, Density-Based Spatial Clustering of Applications with Noise (DBSCAN), and cross-ledger transaction tracking. These methods can identify patterns and links between transactions, allowing investigators to establish connections with real-world entities.

In the recent past, cryptocurrency tracing experts worked with law enforcement to bust large-scale frauds, such as advance-fee and phishing scams. Compliance officers can use tracing techniques to enforce anti-money laundering (AML) regulations and secure the integrity of cryptocurrency ecosystems.

== History ==
Cryptocurrency tracing appeared as a consequence of blockchain technology and digital currencies like Bitcoin and Ethereum. Cryptocurrency scams date back to the early days of Bitcoin. As blockchain technology evolved, so did fraud methods. It took a while to discover that many cryptocurrency transactions are traceable. Advanced tracing techniques can fight crypto crime and facilitate security and compliance in the cryptocurrency ecosystem.

Blockchain technology has redefined online transactions. “Trustless” transactions do not require central intermediaries. Digital cash is semi-transparent, meaning that every transaction leaves a record, but nothing links transactions to identities. Perceived anonymity and borderless online transactions have enabled bad actors to target unsuspecting victims through scams like advance-fee fraud and phishing schemes.

Cryptocurrency tracing is a possible answer to crypto scams. Tracing specialists use methods like blockchain analysis, Density-Based Spatial Clustering of Applications with Noise (DBSCAN), and cross-ledger transaction tracking to identify patterns and establish links between transactions. The objective is to link fraudulent activities to real-world identities and criminal networks.

== Techniques and methods ==
Blockchain researchers have developed and adopted various techniques to track and analyze the flow of digital currencies across blockchain networks, where possible.

=== Blockchain analysis ===
Blockchain analysis peers into the immutable transaction records in blockchain ledgers. By examining transaction histories and identifying patterns, analysts try to link seemingly unrelated transactions and reveal the flow of funds through different addresses and wallets.

=== DBSCAN ===
Density-Based Spatial Clustering of Applications with Noise (DBSCAN) identifies groups of related transactions or addresses by analyzing the density of transaction data points. DBSCAN is an algorithm used in machine learning that can reveal networks of addresses controlled by the same entity, despite obfuscation attempts. By clustering these addresses, investigators can gain a clearer picture of the structure and scale of illicit operations.

=== Cross-ledger transaction tracking ===
Cross-ledger transaction tracking is a technique used to trace the movement of funds across different cryptocurrency networks. Platforms like ShapeShift allow users to exchange one cryptocurrency for another. Investigators can follow funds moving between different blockchains through such platforms, even when criminals try to obscure their origins through currency conversion.

=== Graph analysis ===
Some cryptocurrency tracing specialists use graphs to represent wallets and transactions. The visual representation of blockchain transactions allows investigators to identify patterns, spot address clusters, and gain other insights.

By combining these techniques, law enforcement, regulators, and cybersecurity experts can detect and combat illicit activities, making cryptocurrency ecosystems safer.
