= CryptoNote =

Application layer cryptocurrency protocol

- Original author: Nicolas van Saberhagen
- Written in: C++
- Operating system: Windows, Unix-like, OS X
- Type: Cryptocurrency, anonymity
- License: MIT License
- Website: cryptonote.org
- Repository: github.com/cryptonotefoundation/cryptonote

CryptoNote is an application layer protocol designed for use with cryptocurrencies that aims to solve specific problems identified in Bitcoin.

The protocol powers several decentralized privacy-oriented cryptocurrencies, including Monero, Zano, MobileCoin and Safex Cash.

Nothing is known about the original author of CryptoNote, "Nicolas van Saberhagen." Its mathematical component and motivation are described in the article "CryptoNote Whitepaper", released in two editions: in 2012 and in 2013. Launched in the summer of 2012, Bytecoin was the first cryptocurrency to use this technology. Later, several teams launched their networks, based on the Bytecoin code. Andrey Sabelnikov, one of the creators of the CryptoNote codebase, launched Boolberry after his career at Bytecoin, which later became the foundation for Zano.

== Emission ==
As with Bitcoin, miners are rewarded for finding solutions. But the stepped release curve characteristic of Bitcoin has been replaced with a smooth one in CryptoNote: the reward decreases with each block.

One implementation of the CryptoNote protocol has resulted in a non-smooth emission curve, specifically, the S-curve of the Safex Blockchain, which was designed to match the Diffusion of Innovations technology adoption curve theory.

== Cryptocurrencies based on CryptoNote ==
Several cryptocurrencies have been developed using the CryptoNote protocol. Bytecoin (BCN), launched in 2012, was the first implementation of the protocol. Monero (XMR), a 2014 fork of Bytecoin, introduced changes such as a two-minute block time and modified emission schedule. Other projects include Boolberry (BBR), which experimented with alternative hashing and blockchain pruning, Dashcoin (DSH), which largely retained Bytecoin’s technical design with a different monetary supply, and DigitalNote (XDN), which added features such as encrypted messaging and multisignature support. DarkNetCoin (DNC) was associated with the DarkNetSpace platform and allocated part of block rewards to ecosystem development. Pebblecoin (XPB) employed a memory-intensive proof-of-work algorithm, and Quazarcoin (QCN) originated as a Bitmonero relaunch before shifting focus to distributed file storage. Later projects include Quan Classic, a Brazilian cryptocurrency launched in 2017, and AEON, a Monero fork.

== See also ==
- Monero (cryptocurrency)
