= Karla Jurvetson =

American psychiatrist, philanthropist, and political organizer (born 1966)

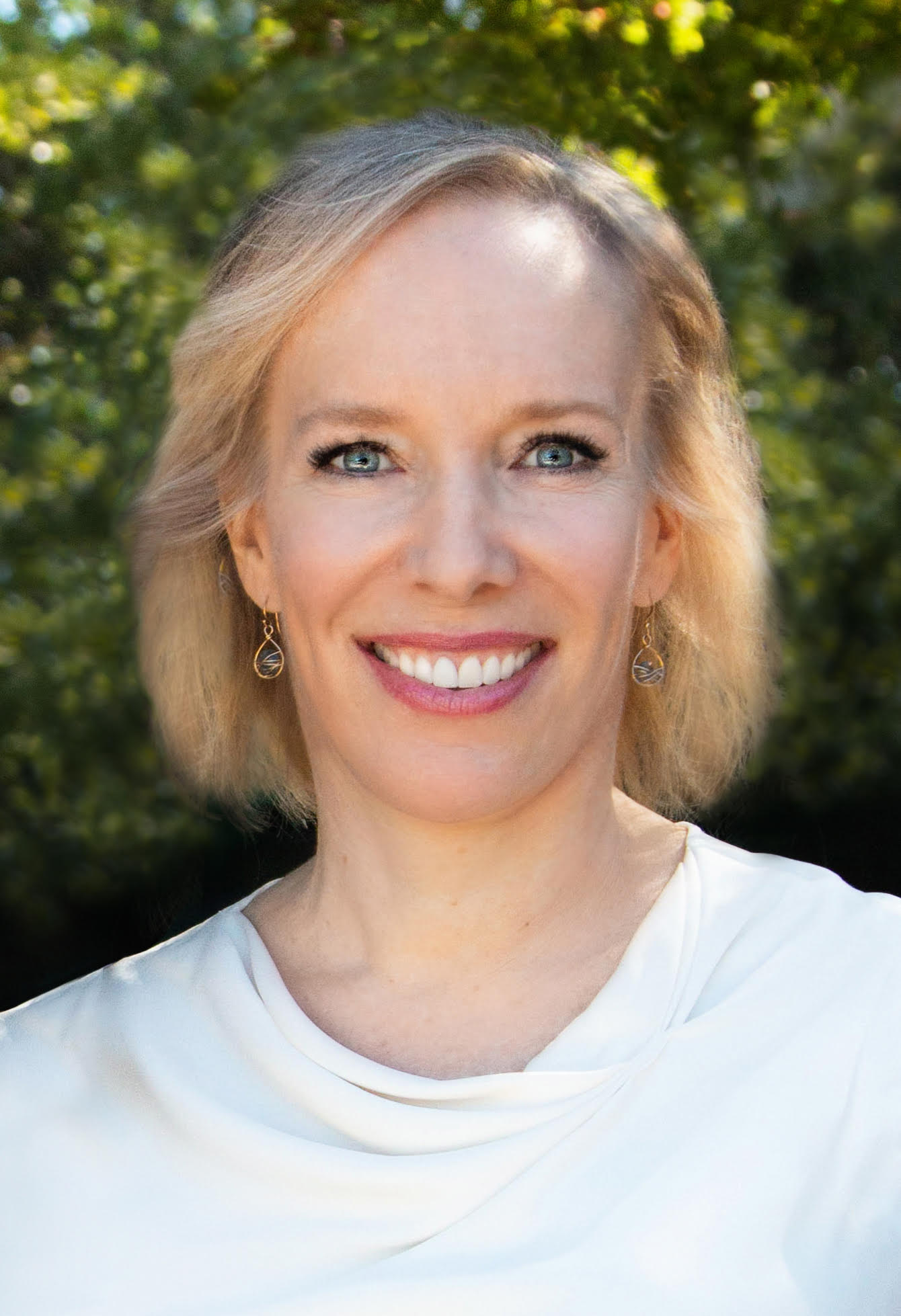
- Jurvetson in 2018
- Born: Karla Tinklenberg; 1966 (age 59–60); New Haven, Connecticut, U.S.
- Education: Stanford University (BS); University of California School of Medicine (MD)
- Occupations: Physician; philanthropist; political organizer
- Spouse: Steve Jurvetson (m. 1990; div. 2018)
- Children: 2

Karla Jurvetson (née Tinklenberg, born 1966) is an American physician, philanthropist, and major Democratic Party donor. She has particularly focused on supporting candidates who are women, racial minorities, and from underrepresented communities, and she is a prominent activist in the movement to protect voting rights and American democracy. Jurvetson is the former vice chair of EMILYs List, which supports Democratic pro-choice women and has more than five million members.

== Life and career ==
Karla Jurvetson was born in New Haven, Connecticut and grew up in Palo Alto, California. Her mother was a nurse, her father Jared Tinklenberg was a physician and medical school professor, and her grandfather was a Christian chaplain in the U.S. Navy. She earned a bachelor's degree in human biology with honors and distinction from Stanford University, a medical doctorate from the University of California School of Medicine, and completed her residency at Stanford Hospital.

In 1990, she married Steve Jurvetson, who became a Silicon Valley early-stage investor in companies including SpaceX in 2000 and Tesla in 2006. They were married for more than 25 years and have two children. They separated in 2015 and were divorced in 2018. In 2017, to honor her father's 50-year career as a medical school professor, Jurvetson helped fund the construction of the new Stanford Medical Center and endowed a professorship in her parents' names.

Jurvetson works as a private practice physician in Los Altos, California.

== Political activism ==
Jurvetson has volunteered as a political organizer and a fundraiser for many Democratic candidates for more than 35 years.

As a Stanford undergraduate in 1988, Jurvetson went door-to-door for Anna Eshoo during her first campaign for Congress, handing out VCR tapes of Eshoo discussing her candidacy. In 2008 Jurvetson volunteered in the swing state of Nevada for then-candidate Barack Obama, as well as making 46 contributions to Democrats totaling $128,700.

After the election of Donald Trump in November 2016, her donations to Democratic candidates markedly increased to $6.9 million in advance of the 2018 midterms, making her one of the nation's top political donors.

For the 2018 elections, Jurvetson helped with voter registration drives and co-hosted fundraisers for many Democratic Party candidates like Stacey Abrams of Georgia.. She also put her psychiatric practice "on pause" to pursue political and policy goals, including expanded voting rights and preserving democracy.

Controversy arose with her large donation of $5.4m to Women Vote!, the political action committee run by EMILY's List. Her donation was in the form of Baidu shares, a Chinese internet company traded on the US stock exchange and was unusual outside of Silicon Valley since it was in the form of stock shares. The controversy arose because only American citizens can donate to U.S. elections. An EMILY's List spokesperson said, "We cleared the donation through our lawyers". In November 2018, Jurvetson was listed as one of five "surprising million dollar donors" to the US midterm elections. EMILY's List would fund the successful campaign of Congresswoman Sharice Davids (KS-03) in 2018, the second Native American woman ever elected to Congress. The Democrats would go on to retake control of the U.S. House of Representatives in 2018.

In November 2019, Jurvetson hosted a Democratic National Committee (DNC) reception at her home with President Barack Obama. NBA player Stephen Curry and his wife, Ayesha Curry, were co-hosts for the event, which raised over $3.5 million for the DNC Unity Fund that was formed to support the eventual Democratic presidential nominee.

In January 2020 she was a large contributor to Persist PAC, which supported Elizabeth Warren's presidential campaign. In June 2020, when Joe Biden secured the Democratic nomination, she contributed $1,000,000 to his PAC, Unite the Country. Outside of the presidential race, Jurvetson donated to more than 500 races across the country in 2020, ranging from congressional contests to state-level races. She also gave $3.9 million to Forward Majority Action, a PAC focused on winning state-level contests.

In 2021 and early 2022, Jurvetson was a leader among major Democratic donors in urging President Biden, Senate Majority Leader Chuck Schumer and Democratic Congressional leaders to pursue passage of comprehensive voting rights legislation, in response to laws passed in many states by Republican legislatures to severely limit or restrict ballot access and voting rights.

For the 2022 election cycle, Jurvetson had "a particular focus on electing Democratic governors in 2024 battleground states who could be a bulwark against election shenanigans if Trump runs again", including support for Katie Hobbs in Arizona, Gretchen Whitmer in Michigan, Josh Shapiro in Pennsylvania.

In 2023, Jurvetson continued her focus on elections in swing and battleground states like Arizona and Wisconsin. Jurvetson was among the first national donors to Judge Janet Protasiewicz in her successful campaign to win a seat on the Wisconsin Supreme Court, a race called "the most important election of 2023." Jurvetson was among the largest donors to the campaign to defeat Issue One in Ohio, placed on the August 2023 ballot by Republican legislators to make it harder for voters to amend the state constitution. The major funders in support of Ohio Issue 1 were conservative Illinois businessman Richard Uihlein and the Cincinnati, Cleveland and Columbus Archdiocese of the Catholic Church. The ballot measure, rejected by Ohio voters 56.5% to 43.5%, was widely seen as an effort to thwart the possibility of voter-approved abortion rights in the state, and took on national significance in the state-by-state battles over abortion access.

She remained active after the November 2024 election and supported Jasmine Crockett in the Texas Senate primary.

In 2026, Jurvetson was an early backer of Scott Colom, the first Black Senator since reconstruction. She also supported Gina Hinojosa for Governor of Texas.

Jurvetson is one of the largest donors to Indivisible, which has led millions of people to mobilize in support of democracy, including for Hands Off and No Kings, which have been in three of the five largest protest marches in American history.
