= Northern Data =

Multinational technology company headquartered in Germany

Northern Data AG
- Predecessors: Whinstone, Northern Bitcoin
- Founded: 2019 in Frankfurt, Germany
- Headquarters: Frankfurt, Germany
- Areas served: International
- Key people: Aroosh Thillainathan (co-CEO); John Hoffman (co-CEO)
- Services: High-performance computing infrastructure, software
- Divisions: Ardent Data Centers, Taiga Cloud
- Website: northerndata.de

Northern Data AG is a multinational technology company headquartered in Germany. It provides GPU infrastructure on demand for high-performance computing in sectors including artificial intelligence, big data analytics, rendering, and cloud computing. Services include a platform for processing large data sets. Formed in 2019 through the merger of Northern Bitcoin and Whinstone, it has two units: its data center business Ardent, and its generative AI cloud service provider Taiga Cloud.

== History ==
=== Predecessor companies (2009-2019) ===
Northern Data's predecessor company, Northern Bitcoin, was founded in 2009 as a bitcoin mining company in Germany. It later transitioned to operating mines for clients, and in 2015 it began trading on the German over-the-counter market. In 2018 it became publicly traded as a crypto miner with Mathis Schultz as CEO. While remaining headquartered in Germany, by 2019 it housed bitcoin mining rigs in Sandane, Norway and offered discounted crypto mining by using cheap renewable energy and fjord-based cooling systems.

=== Whinstone merger and sale (2019-2021) ===
In late 2019, Northern Bitcoin merged with The Whinstone Group, which had been in the bitcoin mining industry since around 2014 and had operations in the Netherlands, Sweden, and the United States. Using its own shares to fund the acquisition, Northern Bitcoin changed its name to Northern Data after the merger. Its headquarters remained in Frankfurt, with Whinstone's founder Aroosh Thillainathan becoming Northern Data's CEO. In 2020, Northern Data reached a market value of US$1 billion on the Frankfurt Stock Exchange. By 2021, Northern Data specialized in high-performance computing (HPC) centers in areas with low-cost electricity, with AI-controlled data centers in countries such as Sweden, the US, Canada, Germany, Norway, and the Netherlands. As of February 2021, Northern Data's facility in Rockdale, Texas was the world's largest crypto mine.

Northern Data sold Whinstone, its US operation, for about US$651 million to Riot Blockchain in April 2021. In August 2021, Northern Data bought around 223,000 older generation AMD and Nvidia GPUs from block.one for $430 million. It purchased a bitcoin miner from block.one the following month for $468 million. Also in 2021, Germany's security regulator BaFin filed a complaint over claims that Northern Data had misstated revenues, which a public prosecutor’s office in Frankfurt declined to investigate due to "a lack of initial suspicion."

=== Diversification (2022-2024) ===
In September 2023, Tether Group agreed to spend $420 million on 10,000 H100 Nvidia GPUs in a deal that also gave it 20% of Northern Data's shares. Northern Data secured $610 million in debt financing in November 2023, with the money to be focused on AI services. Northern Data established three distinct units in 2023; its data center business Ardent, its generative AI cloud service provider Taiga, and its bitcoin mining operations Peak Mining.

In May 2024, Northern Data stated it was reducing its focus on crypto mining in favor of running AI as a service with Nvidia's GPU chip Blackwell. In June 2024, Northern Data, Nvidia, HPE, Deloitte, and Supermicro partnered on a launch accelerator to provide free AI computing to startup companies. Northern Data purchased 2,000 Nvidia H200 GPUs in July 2024, claiming it was the first European cloud provider to provide an H200 GPU cluster. By that point, Northern Data had spent over $800 million purchasing Nvidia GPUs. Northern Data announced in December 2024 that it was developing a data center in Maysville, Georgia. The company's annual sales revenue for 2024 came to €200.3 million.

=== Recent developments (2025-2026) ===
In February 2025, Northern Data started the process of uplisting to the Prime Standard on the Frankfurt Stock Exchange. It invested in Noxtua, an AI startup, in April 2025, and also began working with the AI and cloud provider Gcore. In May 2025, Northern Data announced a partnership with Deloitte on an AI factory in Europe. In August 2025, Core42 signed a deal to access 10,000 GPUs through the Taiga Cloud business.

The European Public Prosecutor's Office raided the company's offices in Germany and a subsidiary's office in Sweden in September 2025, detaining four employees, suspecting a 2023 purchase of 10,000 H100 GPUs was used for crypto mining instead of AI to claim illegal tax breaks. Northern Data denied the allegations, stating its current hardware was strictly used for cloud computing, and that investigators had a "misunderstanding" of its legacy mining operations. Tom's Hardware, reporting on the investigation, noted that using H100 GPUs for crypto mining instead of AI computing would have been "a poor investment".

In September 2025, Northern Data's COO John Hoffman became a co-CEO along with Aroosh Thillanathan. In November 2025, Northern Data sold its Peak Mining division for up to $200 million. Northern Data by January 2026 had agreed to be acquired by Rumble for US$767 million, with the deal expected to close later that year. As of 2026, Northern Data had 24,000 GPUs being used in 10 different data centers.

== Divisions ==
Northern Data has two segments.

=== Taiga Cloud ===
Taiga Cloud is a generative AI cloud service provider. In August 2025, Taiga held 20,480 Nvidia H100s and around 2,000 Nvidia H200s overall.

=== Ardent Data Centers ===
Ardent Data Centers is a division for data center design and operation. As of May 2025, Ardent operated data centers in Boden, Sweden and in the Norwegian cities of Lefdal and Kristiansand. Ardent opened a new AI data center in Robinson, Pennsylvania in June 2025.

== See also ==
- Tether Limited
