= Bo Hines =

American former government official (born 1995)

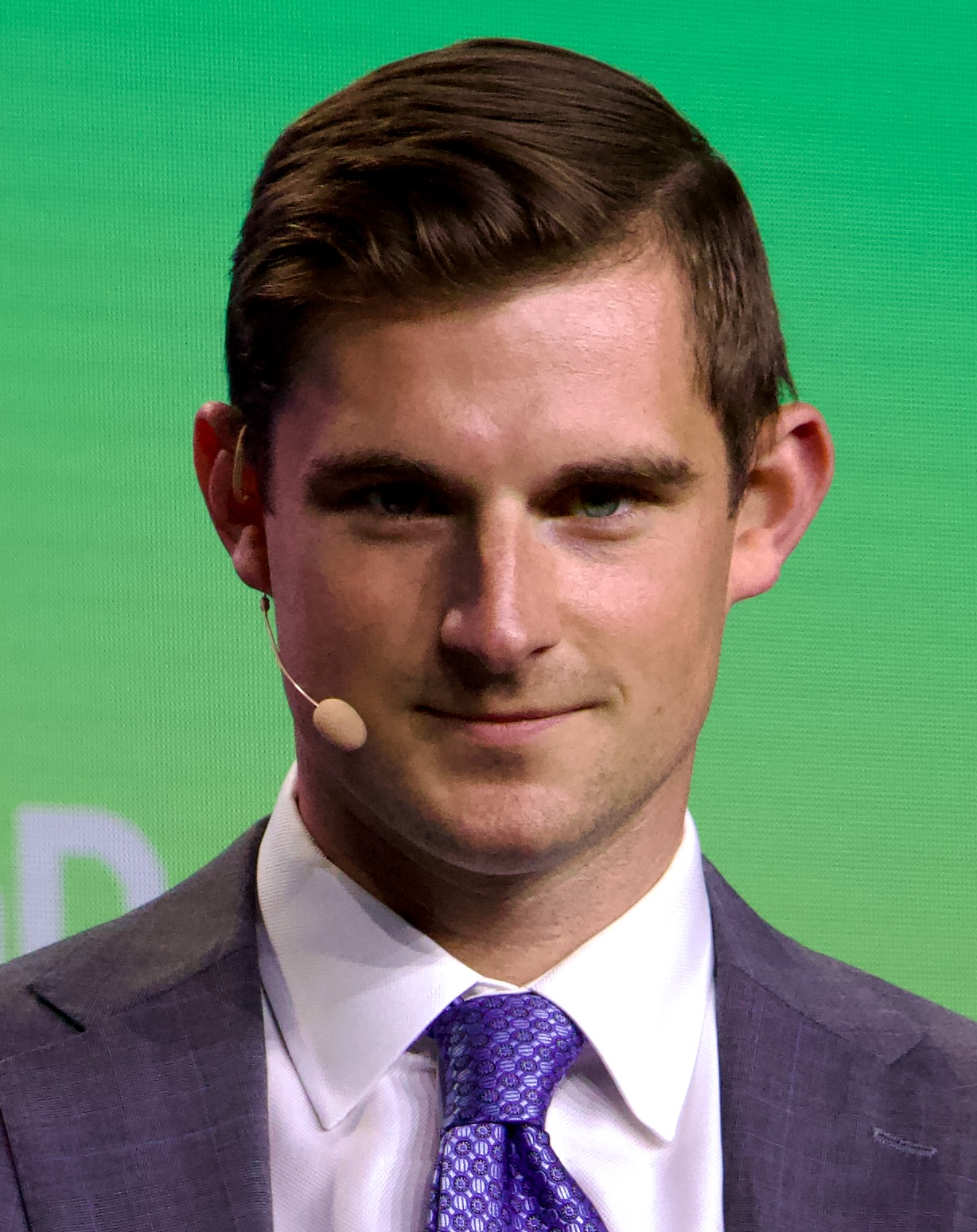
- Hines in 2025

Executive Director of the President's Council of Advisers on Digital Assets
- In office January 20, 2025 – August 9, 2025
- President: Donald Trump
- Preceded by: Position established
- Succeeded by: Patrick Witt

Personal details
- Born: August 29, 1995 (age 31) Charlotte, North Carolina, U.S.
- Party: Republican
- Spouse(s): Olivia Andretti (m. 2017; div. 2019) Mary Bryson (m. 2021)
- Education: Yale University (BA); Wake Forest University (JD)
- Football career

Profile
- Position: Wide receiver

Career information
- High school: Charlotte Christian School
- College: NC State (2014); Yale (2015)

Awards and highlights
- Freshman All-American (2014)
- Stats at ESPN

Robert Nicholas "Bo" Hines (born August 29, 1995) is an American businessman, former government official, and former college football player from North Carolina. Since September 2025, he is CEO for Tether U.S., the United States arm of cryptocurrency stablecoin Tether Limited.

Hines played college football for the NC State Wolfpack and Yale Bulldogs. In 2022, he was the Republican nominee in North Carolina's 13th congressional district. From January to August 2025, Hines was the executive director of the President's Council of Advisers on Digital Assets in Donald Trump's second administration. Prior to his role in public office he was the co-founder of the investment firm Nxum Capital.

== Early life and education ==
Hines was born in Charlotte, North Carolina. His father played for the Detroit Lions of the National Football League and the Hamilton Tiger-Cats of the Canadian Football League.

Hines attended Charlotte Christian School, where he played football as a wide receiver.

=== Football career ===
Hines attended North Carolina State University to play college football for the NC State Wolfpack. He led NC State with 45 receptions and 616 receiving yards, including three passes for 79 yards in the 2014 St. Petersburg Bowl.

In 2015, Hines transferred to Yale University because of his interest in politics. He played in four games for the Yale Bulldogs during the 2015 season, catching 11 passes for 134 yards, but missed the rest of the season and the 2016 season due to a separated shoulder that required surgery.

In 2017, Hines retired from college football. He received his Juris Doctor degree from Wake Forest University School of Law in 2022.

== Political career ==
=== 2022 election ===
In January 2021, Hines announced that he would run as a Republican for the United States House of Representatives in North Carolina's 5th congressional district, held by Republican Virginia Foxx.

In February 2022, the North Carolina Supreme Court struck down North Carolina's congressional lines, stating they were "unconstitutional beyond a reasonable doubt." After the North Carolina district lines were thrown out, Hines switched districts to run in the newly created 13th congressional district which is based in the suburbs of Raleigh. He received the endorsement of former President Donald Trump on March 14, who called Hines a "fighter for Conservative values."

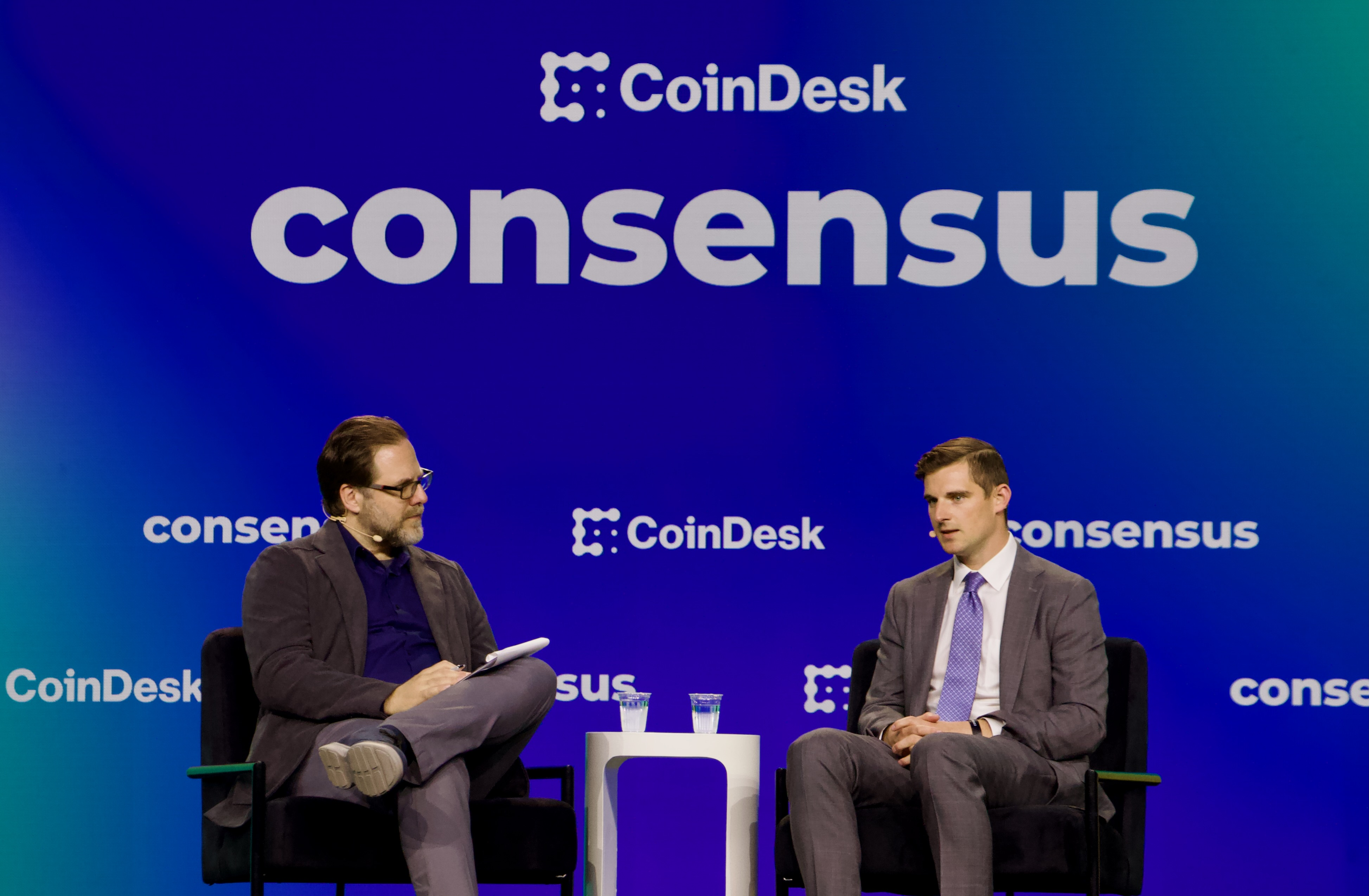
Hines at Consensus 2025

In April 2022, local Republicans campaigned against Hines through newspaper advertisements, email blasts, and door-knocking because Hines did not live in the district in which he was running. He lived in Winston-Salem, the heart of the old 5th, but he was in the process of moving to Fuquay-Varina in the new 13th. Members of the House are only required to live in the state they represent, but longstanding convention calls for them to live in or close to the district they represent.

On May 17, 2022, Hines won the Republican primary against seven opponents, garnering 32 percent of the vote and defeating his closest opponent by nearly double digits. Hines narrowly lost the election to Democratic state Senator Wiley Nickel.

In May 2022, Business Insider reported that Hines was funding the majority of his campaign with a trust fund. However, campaign finance disclosures show that only 28 percent of Hines' race was self-funded, with a majority of campaign contributions coming from individual donors. While campaigning on an "America-First economy", Hines faced criticism because his campaign hats were made in China.

On the campaign trail, Hines said he was personally opposed to abortion rights, but that abortion is a states rights issue. Hines said, "This is a Raleigh issue, not a Washington issue." Hines expressed belief that the 2020 election was stolen.

=== 2024 election ===
Hines ran as a Republican in North Carolina's 6th congressional district in the 2024 election. Despite support from the Club for Growth, Hines came in fourth place. Addison McDowell, who was endorsed by Donald Trump, won the Republican primary and the general election.

=== Trump administration ===
In December 2024, then-President-elect Donald Trump announced that Hines would join his administration as Executive Director of the President's Council of Advisers on Digital Assets, taking office on January 20, 2025. Hines's position was described as the "White House Digital Asset Policy Advisor" and as "Digital Policy Czar." During his time with the administration, Hines helped to shepherd the creation of the GENIUS Act into law, and acted as a key aide on other cryptocurrency initiatives as well, according to the Wall Street Journal.

Hines announced his resignation from the Trump administration on August 9, 2025, and said he planned to return to the private sector.

== Private sector ==
=== Nxum Capital ===
Before his role in the Trump administration, Hines cofounded the investment firm called Nxum Capital with his father Todd Hines.

=== Tether ===
In August 2025 Hines began working for El Salvadorian cryptocurrency firm Tether, the largest stablecoin issuer in the world, as CEO of United States operations. In this role, Hines was tasked with aiding the expansion of the company further into the US. In September 2025 Hines was named CEO of Tether U.S., and as of the following year, Hines stated that Tether was between Germany and Saudi Arabia in terms of the world's top twenty holders of US T-bills, with $122 billion.

== Personal life ==
Hines married Olivia Elizabeth Andretti in June 2017. The couple divorced in July 2019, and Hines married Mary Charles Bryson in July 2021.
