= Paolo Ardoino =

Italian computer scientist (born 1984)

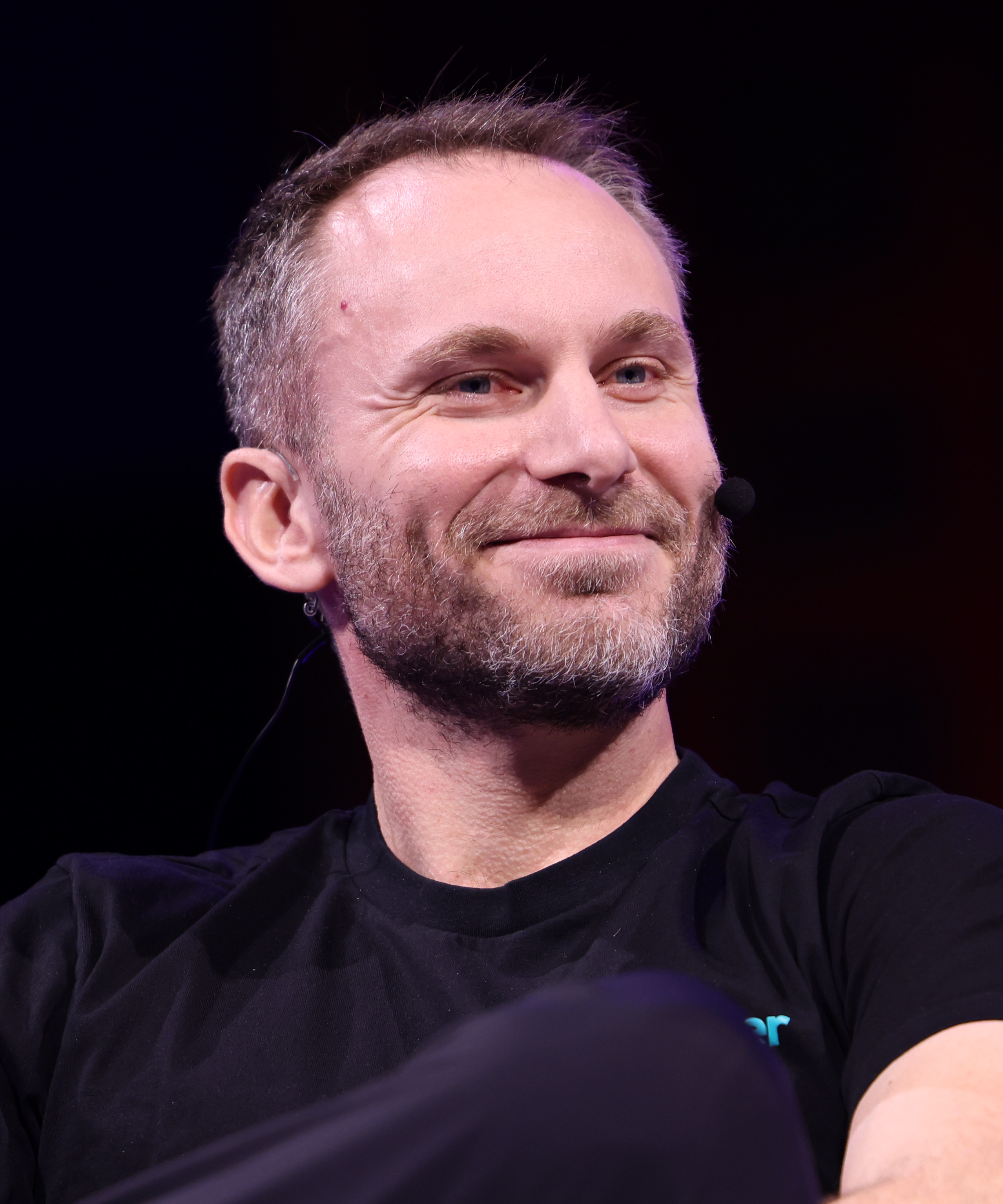
- Ardoino in 2025
- Born: 1984 (age 41–42); Cisano sul Neva, Italy
- Citizenship: Italy
- Education: University of Genoa (BS)
- Occupation: Computer scientist
- Known for: Tether and Bitfinex

Paolo Ardoino (born 22 October 1984) is an Italian billionaire businessman and computer scientist who has served as the chief executive officer (CEO) of Tether since December 2023. He also serves as chief technology officer (CTO) of Bitfinex.

He previously served as CTO of Tether from 2017 to 2023, during which time he was involved in the development of the company's technical infrastructure. He has also been associated with initiatives related to cryptocurrency adoption and financial technology, including projects in Europe and Latin America.

According to Forbes, Ardoino is the 55th-richest person in the world, with a net worth estimated at $38 billion as of July 2026.

== Early life and education ==
Ardoino was born in 1984 in Cisano sul Neva, Savona, Italy. He began coding at the age of eight. He obtained a bachelor's degree in computer science from the University of Genoa.

== Career ==
=== Early career ===
After completing his education, Ardoino joined the University of Genoa as researcher, where he worked on research projects involving cybersecurity and cryptography for military applications. He left the University of Genoa in 2011. In 2011, Ardoino worked at a hedge fund, where he developed and calibrated trading algorithms.

In 2013, Ardoino moved to London, where he founded Fincluster, a technology startup that built cloud-based financial service applications for fund managers and institutions across London, Milan, and Lugano.

=== Bitfinex and Tether ===
In 2014, Ardoino joined Bitfinex as a software engineer. At Bitfinex, he worked on the exchange’s trading engine and backend infrastructure, focusing on scalability and high availability. In 2016, he became chief technology officer. In 2017, Ardoino became chief technology officer of Tether.

=== Later work and leadership ===
In 2022, Ardoino founded Holepunch, an open-source platform designed for building P2P products with computer scientist Mathias Buus. In March 2022, he worked with Michele Foletti, the mayor of Lugano, Switzerland, to accept Tether and other cryptocurrencies for municipal payments.

In December 2023, Ardoino was appointed chief executive officer of Tether. Under his leadership, Tether's stablecoin, USDT, has become the largest United States dollar-backed stablecoin by market capitalization. Bitfinex has also been reported to be among the largest exchanges by Bitcoin holdings.

In 2022, Ardoino helped handle the effects of the Terra/LUNA collapse in May 2022, where Tether processed $7 billion in withdrawals within 48 hours, and $20 billion in the following weeks, without losing its peg. Ardoino expanded Tether's holdings of U.S. Treasury bills, Bitcoin, and gold. In 2026, Tether held more Treasury bills than countries such as South Korea and Germany.

Tether has invested approximately $2.5 billion in sustainable energy and technology sectors and about $1 billion in artificial intelligence infrastructure company Northern Data and $200 million in Blackrock Neurotech, an American brain implant company, taking a majority stake. Ardoino has stated that these investments are funded from Tether's profits rather than customer reserves.

In January 2025, Ardoino said that Tether would relocate its headquarters to El Salvador after obtaining a digital asset service provider license there, and that he and other company executives planned to move their residences to the country.

Under his leadership, Tether has supported El Salvador's Volcano Energy renewable power project aimed at supporting the country's Bitcoin adoption, and has invested in renewable energy and sustainable Bitcoin mining initiatives in Uruguay.

=== 2025–present ===
Following the passage of the GENIUS Act, Ardoino attended the signing of the legislation at the White House. He was also acknowledged by President Donald Trump in opening remarks.

From early 2025, Ardoino oversaw Tether's acquisition of a minority stake in Juventus Football Club. Tether first disclosed a stake in February 2025, and by April had accumulated a 10.7% holding, making it the second-largest shareholder behind the Agnelli family's holding company Exor, the first time a major European football club had counted a cryptocurrency company among its largest shareholders. In November 2025, Ardoino submitted a binding all-cash offer to acquire Exor's 65.4% majority stake for approximately €1.1 billion, pledging an additional €1 billion investment in the club. Exor's board unanimously rejected the proposal. As of early 2026, Tether retained its 11.5% minority stake and board representation. Ardoino indicated the company remained interested in the club's long-term development.

Ardoino also helped Tether launch QVAC, an on-device artificial intelligence platform designed to run AI models locally on consumer hardware without reliance on centralized cloud infrastructure. In March 2026, Tether led a Series C funding round of up to $1.4 billion in Neura Robotics, a German humanoid robotics company, which was backed by Tether alongside co-investors including Nvidia, Amazon, Qualcomm, Bosch, and the European Investment Bank. As part of the investment, Neura Robotics integrated QVAC's edge AI runtime into its Neuraverse platform. This allowed robots to process decisions locally without centralised infrastructure.
