= Eight Sleep =

American technology company

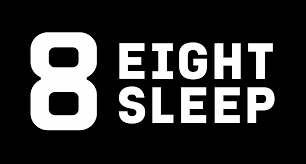
- Type: Private
- Industry: Mattresses
- Founded: 2014
- Founders: Matteo Franceschetti, Massimo Andreasi Bassi, Andrea Ballarini, and Alexandra Zatarain
- Headquarters: New York City, U.S.
- Products: Smart mattress
- Website: eightsleep.com

Eight Sleep is an American company that develops products for "sleep fitness".

== History ==
Eight Sleep was founded in 2014 in San Francisco by Matteo Franceschetti, Massimo Andreasi Bassi, Andrea Ballarini, and Alexandra Zatarain.

The company financed their first projects through a crowdfunding campaign in 2015. Since 2016, the company has raised multiple rounds through venture capital, include a Series B fundraising round in 2018 and a Series C fundraising round in 2021 led by Valor Equity Partners with participation from SoftBank and Founders Fund.

In 2022, Eight Sleep acquired health coaching company Span Health. In November 2024, they expanded to the United Arab Emirates as part of a Middle East growth strategy, citing studies showing 40% of UAE residents struggle with sleep quality.

In March 2026, stablecoin issuer Tether's investment arm led a $50 million investment round into Eight Sleep.

== Products ==
Eight Sleep's flagship product is the Pod mattress. The company has integrated its products with Amazon's Echo devices. In 2024, Eight Sleep launched the fourth generation of the Pod, Pod 4.

In 2021, The Strategist described the company's Pod mattress as the only product of its type able to provide perceptible temperature control. A more recent review from that same product review website, however, noted that "the Eight Sleep's temperature-controlling features are easily found elsewhere for cheaper." In February 2023, Eight Sleep started to require a paid subscription (with an annual cost ranging from $180 to $288) to access most of the Pod's functionality, including basic features like sleep tracking and variable temperature control.

== Criticism ==
On October 20, 2025, Eight Sleep mattresses were found to be overheating or not cooling down properly due to an outage at an Amazon Web Services data center. Matteo Franceschetti apologized on Twitter for the issue and announced that Eight Sleep mattresses will be equipped with an offline mode, preventing such future accidents. As of January 2026, an offline mode has not yet been released into production, and has not been discussed publicly by Eight Sleep since the October 2025 outage. (Since July 2025, there exists an unofficial, open source project that provides full support for offline operation of the Eight Sleep, bypassing the Eight Sleep servers and requiring no paid subscription.)
