= Bitfinex =

Cryptocurrency exchange

Bitfinex, Inc.
- Company type: Private
- Available in: English, Russian, Chinese, Spanish, Turkish
- Founded: 2012; 14 years ago
- Area served: 52 countries
- Owners: founder - Giancarlo Devasini (43%), CEO - Jean-Louis van der Velde (15%), general counsel - Stuart Hoegner (15%), investor - Christopher Harborne (12%), other investors (14%)
- Products: Bitfinex app, Bitfinex Securities, Derivatives
- Services: Cryptocurrency exchange, P2P Margin trading, P2P Margin lending, OTC, Exchange trading, Cryptocurrency lending
- Website: bitfinex.com

Bitfinex is a cryptocurrency exchange owned and operated by iFinex Inc, and is registered in the British Virgin Islands and regulated in El Salvador. Bitfinex was founded in 2012. It was originally a peer-to-peer bitcoin exchange, and later added support for other cryptocurrencies. Bitfinex was one of the first professional platforms built for cryptocurrency trading. Bitfinex is the world's second-largest exchange by number of bitcoins held in its digital wallet, and is estimated to have about 403,000 bitcoins. It has 1.6 million users. In 2025, it announced the implementation of zero trading fees for all spot, margin, and derivatives trading on its platform.

== History ==
=== 2012: Early history ===
Bitfinex was founded in December 2012 as a peer-to-peer (P2P) bitcoin exchange offering digital asset trading services to users worldwide. Bitfinex initially started as a P2P margin lending platform for bitcoin and later added support for more cryptocurrencies. It was one of the first professional platforms built for cryptocurrency trading.

Raphael Nicolle, an IT technician from Paris, launched Bitfinex following a previous project called Bitcoinica. He continued to work as a developer for the platform until the beginning of 2017. Bitfinex was designed to offer high-volume trading and both spot and derivatives products, including exchange trading, margin trading, margin funding (P2P lending), over-the-counter markets, and derivatives trading.

=== 2015–2016: New partnership and security breach ===
In 2015, Bitfinex partnered with Palo Alto company BitGo to offer highly-secured wallets that allow people to store their digital currencies online. BitGo has insurance against bitcoin theft. In May 2015, the exchange was hacked, which resulted in the loss of 1,500 bitcoins or about $400,000 USD of their customers' assets. In June 2016, the U.S. Commodity Futures Trading Commission ordered Bitfinex to pay a $75,000 fine for offering illegal off-exchanged financed commodity transactions. The order also found that Bitfinex violated the Commodity Exchange Act by not registering as a Futures Commission Merchant.

=== 2016 hack ===
In August 2016, Bitfinex announced it had suffered a major security breach. Immediately thereafter, bitcoin's trading price plunged by 20%. After learning of the breach, Bitfinex halted all bitcoin withdrawals and trading. In that hack, the second-biggest breach of a bitcoin exchange platform, 119,756 units of bitcoin, worth about $72 million at the time, were stolen. The bitcoin was taken from users' segregated wallets, while Bitfinex said it was tracking down the perpetrators of the hack. Exchange customers, even those whose accounts were not broken into, had their account balance reduced by 36% and received BFX tokens in proportion to their losses. All users who kept their BFX tokens were reimbursed in full within eight months of the hack in April 2017. The exchange's access to U.S. dollar payments and withdrawals was then curtailed. The hack happened even though Bitfinex was securing the funds with BitGo, which uses multiple-signature security.

The U.S. Department of Justice recovered the stolen bitcoin, and a New York couple, Ilya Lichtenstein and his wife, Heather R. Morgan, was federally charged in February 2022 with conspiring to launder the bitcoin, which was then worth $3.6 billion. According to Justice officials, Lichtenstein and Morgan are charged with conspiracy to launder money and conspiracy to defraud the United States. On February 10, 2022, it was reported that Morgan was detained in Manhattan on February 8, 2022, with her husband. According to court records, Lichtenstein and Morgan appeared for a plea hearing on August 3, 2023, in Washington, D.C. They were charged in the case with a document known as an information, which is a type of charging document that federal prosecutors typically use when defendants have agreed to plead guilty.

Since Lichtenstein and Morgan's arrests, the government seized another $475 million tied to the attack. In August 2023, Lichtenstein pleaded guilty to a conspiracy to launder stolen cryptocurrency in Washington, D.C. Morgan also pleaded guilty to two charges, money laundering conspiracy and conspiracy to defraud the U.S. government. The value of the stolen bitcoin ended up being worth $4.5 billion. Lichtenstein also admitted to being the original hacker of bitcoin in the 2016 cyberattack on Bitfinex. In November 2024, Lichtenstein was sentenced to five years in a U.S. prison for his involvement in money laundering the stolen bitcoin. Morgan was sentenced to 18 months in prison for fraud and conspiracy charges.

Referring to the 2016 hack, IRS Commissioner Charles Rettig said, "This was also the largest single financial seizure recorded by the federal government." Separately, Bitfinex worked with the U.S. Department of Homeland Security to recover about $315,000 in cash and cryptocurrencies stolen in the 2016 breach. The funds would be redistributed to holders of Bitfinex's Recovery Right Tokens, digital coins issued to people who suffered financial losses due to the hack. There was concern their customers' money had been lost in several incidents; the missing funds were not lost but seized and safeguarded. During this same period, Bitfinex found that obtaining banking services was more and more difficult. Research suggests that price manipulation of bitcoin on Bitfinex accounted for about half of bitcoin's price increase in late 2017. iFinex issued the cryptocurrency Unus Sed Leo in 2019. Once the United States announced that most of the stolen funds were recovered, Leo's value surged more than 50%. Bitfinex promised to repurchase and burn outstanding LEO tokens within 18 months of the funds’ recovery.

=== 2017–2018: Banking changes ===
In April 2017, Bitfinex announced it was experiencing delays in processing USD withdrawals after Wells Fargo cut off its wire transfers. Shortly after the Wells Fargo cutoff, Bitfinex stated all international wires had been cut off by its Taiwanese bank. Since then, Bitfinex has moved between a series of banks in other countries without disclosing to customers where the money is kept. Noble Bank International of San Juan, Puerto Rico, reportedly handled some dollar banking for the exchange in 2017 or 2018. The banking relationship was reportedly terminated in September 2018 as Noble Bank encountered financial difficulties.

In March 2018, British Virgin Islands-based Bitfinex confirmed the exchange’s plans to relocate its primary server infrastructure to Zug, Switzerland. Phil Potter, Chief Strategy Officer of Bitfinex, left the exchange on June 22, 2018. On October 15, 2018, Bitfinex said that a few days earlier it temporarily paused fiat deposits for certain customers amid processing complications. On October 7, the company also said that "Bitfinex is not insolvent."

=== 2019: Launch of Tether investigation ===
Tether is a stablecoin pegged to the USD. It is owned by iFinex, which also owns Bitfinex. It was launched as RealCoin in July 2014 and was rebranded as Tether in November 2014. As of January 2023, Tether was the third-largest cryptocurrency after Bitcoin and Ethereum. Tether and Bitfinex funded the development of HolePunch, an encrypted, peer-to-peer communication platform and made its code open source in December 2022. Paolo Ardoino, the chief technology officer of Bitfinex and CEO of Tether, said that this technology is the "Bitcoin of communications".

In April 2019, New York Attorney General Letitia James launched an investigation accusing Bitfinex of using the reserves of Tether, an affiliated company, to cover up a loss of $850 million to a Panamanian payment processor known as Crypto Capital Corp. Reggie Fowler, who is alleged to have connections with Crypto Capital, was indicted on 30 April 2019, for running an unlicensed money-transmitting business for cryptocurrency traders. He is believed to have failed to return about $850 million to an unnamed client. Investigators also seized $14,000 in counterfeit currency from his office. Bitfinex had been unable to obtain a normal banking relationship, according to the lawsuit, so it deposited over $1 billion with a Panamanian payment processor known as Crypto Capital Corp. No contract was ever signed with Crypto Capital. James alleged that in 2018 Bitfinex knew or suspected that Crypto Capital had absconded with the money, but that their investors were never informed of the loss.

Bitfinex's reported figures for 2017 were $333.5 million in gross profits, $6.8 million in expenses, $326 million in net profit, and $246 million in dividends.

=== 2020–2026: Acquisitions and investments ===
On October 15, 2021, it was announced that Bitfinex would pay a $1.5 million fine to the Commodity Futures Trading Commission for illegal, off-exchange retail commodity transactions in digital assets with Americans. In 2021, Bitfinex launched a new payment platform, Bitfinex Pay, that would allow online merchants to receive cryptocurrency payments. Bitfinex, Kraken, and KuCoin began entering the Indian cryptocurrency market in 2021. In September 2022, Bitfinex, alongside several other leading exchanges, temporarily paused all deposits and withdrawals of Ethereum-based tokens during the Ethereum software upgrade known as the Merge. In December 2022, Bitfinex published the "Freedom Manifesto", which advocates for distributed, open-source software and libertarian economics.

As of January 2023, Bitfinex announced plans to open an office in El Salvador. El Salvador plans to issue its "volcano" token this year, which will be issued using blockchain technology, and which will trade on Bitfinex's exchange. In April 2023, Bitfinex Securities was granted a license by El Salvador’s National Digital Asset Commission to operate in the country. The license permits Bitfinex Securities El Salvador to facilitate tokenized assets. On May 24, 2023, Bitfinex announced it would invest in the Chilean cryptocurrency exchange Orionx. Bitfinex stated that it aims to expand its presence in Chile and Latin America. Bitfinex launched its peer-to-peer trading platform in Venezuela, Argentina, and Colombia in June 2023.

In January 2025, Bitfinex Derivatives was granted a licence by El Salvador's National Digital Asset Commission to operate in the country.

In 2025, Bitfinex introduced zero-fee trading across its spot, margin, perpetual derivatives, and over-the-counter markets, applying the policy to both maker and taker transactions. The exchange has said that its revenue is diversified beyond trading fees, including income from its peer-to-peer margin lending market and services for institutional clients.

In May 2026, Bitfinex received a Digital Asset Service Provider license from El Salvador's National Commission on Digital Assets. This expanded its operations in the country by allowing the platform to offer regulated local services. This follows the licensing of Bitfinex Securities in April 2023.

== Tether ==
Tether is a stablecoin that Tether Limited had claimed to be pegged to the UDS. Tether is closely associated with Bitfinex; as of 2018, they shared common shareholders and management. In 2017, critics raised questions about the relationship between Bitfinex and Tether. In February 2021, Bitfinex agreed to pay $18.5 million in a settlement with the New York Attorney General's office regarding allegations over Bitfinex parent iFinex making false statements about the backing of Tether and the movement of hundreds of millions USD between the two companies to cover up massive losses by Bitfinex in 2017 and 2018. As part of the agreement, Bitfinex would maintain its prohibition on trading activity with New Yorkers. On August 4, 2023, the class action lawsuit against Tether and Bitfinex was dismissed by Chief Judge Laura Taylor Swain of the U.S. District Court for the Southern District of New York. The court found that the plaintiff lacked "plausible allegations of injury" because there was no evidence showing "USDT had a diminished actual value".

== See also ==
- Cryptocurrency bubble
