= David Reger =

German entrepreneur and robotics executive (born 1988)

- Reger in 2024
- Born: 12 June 1988 (age 38); Metzingen, Baden-Württemberg, West Germany
- Occupation: Entrepreneur
- Years active: 2013–present
- Known for: Founder and CEO of Neura Robotics

David Reger (born June 12, 1988) is a German entrepreneur and the founder and chief executive officer of Neura Robotics, a robotics manufacturer based in Metzingen, Baden-Württemberg.

== Early life ==
Reger was born on June 12, 1988 and grew up in Metzingen as the second-eldest of eleven children. He completed a Hauptschule leaving certificate, trained as a technical model maker, and did not attend university.

Around 2009, Reger moved to San Francisco, where he worked as a social worker on the reintegration of former prisoners.

== Career ==
=== Switzerland ===
Reger returned to Europe in 2013 and worked in Switzerland as a designer and manager at several high-technology firms in the automation and robotics sectors.

=== Neura Robotics ===
Reger founded Neura Robotics in Metzingen in 2019. He has described the company's approach as a "one-device" design that integrates sensors, perception and artificial intelligence components into a single platform, in contrast to the prevailing practice of arranging sensing equipment around a robot's workspace.

The company's product line includes the LARA collaborative robot arm, the MAiRA mobile manipulator, the humanoid robot 4NE-1, and Neuraverse, a platform intended to allow deployed robots to share learned behaviours.

== Views ==
Reger has argued that humanoid robotics is a response to demographic change and shortages of skilled labour rather than a novelty, contending that ageing societies face rising service demand alongside declining willingness to take on heavy, dangerous or monotonous work. He has described cognitive robots as "smartphones with arms and legs" and has said that the economic potential of the category exceeds that of the smartphone.

== Recognition ==
- 2024 – Named a "Vordenker" (thought leader) in the Innovation category by Handelsblatt
- 2025 – "Innovator of the Year", Deutscher Innovationspreis (German Innovation Award).
- 2025 – Deutscher Gründerpreis, "Aufsteiger" (Rising Star) category.
- 2025 – EY Entrepreneur Of The Year (Germany), "Junge Unternehmen" (young companies) category.

Reger has been appointed to the German Economic Senate (Wirtschaftssenat), the Wirtschaftsrat and the European Senate for Economy and Technology.
