= Whop.com =

American social commerce platform for digital products

Whop
- Type: Private
- Industry: E-commerce; Social commerce
- Founded: 2021; 5 years ago in Brooklyn, New York
- Founders: Steven Schwartz; Cameron Zoub; Jack Sharkey
- Headquarters: Brooklyn, New York, United States
- Area served: Worldwide
- Key people: Steven Schwartz (CEO); Jack Sharkey (CTO)
- Products: Whop platform
- Services: Digital goods marketplace Payment processing Creator economy tools Community and subscription management
- Website: whop.com

Whop, Inc. is an American technology company and business platform that enables entrepreneurs, influencers, and small businesses to sell products, memberships, subscriptions, and software directly to consumers. The company was founded in 2021 by Steven Schwartz, Cameron Zoub, and Jack Sharkey. It is headquartered in Brooklyn, New York.

== History ==
Whop was founded in March 2021 by Steven Schwartz and Cameron Zoub, who had met as middle school-age teenagers in a Facebook group dedicated to sneaker reselling, and by software developer Jack Sharkey. As teenagers, Schwartz and Zoub had written sneaker bots used to purchase limited-edition footwear, later launching several other ventures before conceiving of Whop as a marketplace for digital goods. Schwartz, who studied at New York University's Stern School of Business and interned at Accenture in Singapore, graduated in 2021, the same year Whop was launched.

In July 2023, Whop raised US$17 million in a Series A funding round led by Insight Partners, with participation from Peter Thiel, The Chainsmokers, Kevin O'Leary, Justin Mateen, Justin Kan, James Harden, and others.

In June 2024, Whop raised US$50 million in a Series B round led by Bain Capital Ventures at a valuation of US$800 million. That same year, Whop moved their headquarters to the Domino Sugar Refinery, a redeveloped former sugar refinery in Williamsburg, Brooklyn. At the time, the company had approximately 30 employees.

In February 2026, Tether invested US$200 million in Whop at a valuation of US$1.6 billion.By June, the company had grown to 120 employees.

In October 2026, Whop raised US$205 million in a Series D round led by Sequoia Capital, with participation from Shopify's venture arm, at a valuation of US$5.1 billion. Sequoia's Doug Leone joined the company's board as part of the investment. At the time of the round, Whop reported annualized revenue of more than US$400 million.

== Platform ==
Whop operates an online platform that provides individuals and businesses with tools to sell products and services, process payments, and manage business operations. The platform supports offerings including software, online courses, subscription-based communities, and professional services.

Whop's Content Rewards feature has been used by the music industry for marketing campaigns known as clipping, in which paid editors are hired to circulate short-form videos of an artist's music across social media. These campaigns have featured artists such as Mumford & Sons, Brandi Carlile, and John Summit.

== See also ==
- List of online marketplaces
