= Chris Pavlovski =

Canadian technology entrepreneur

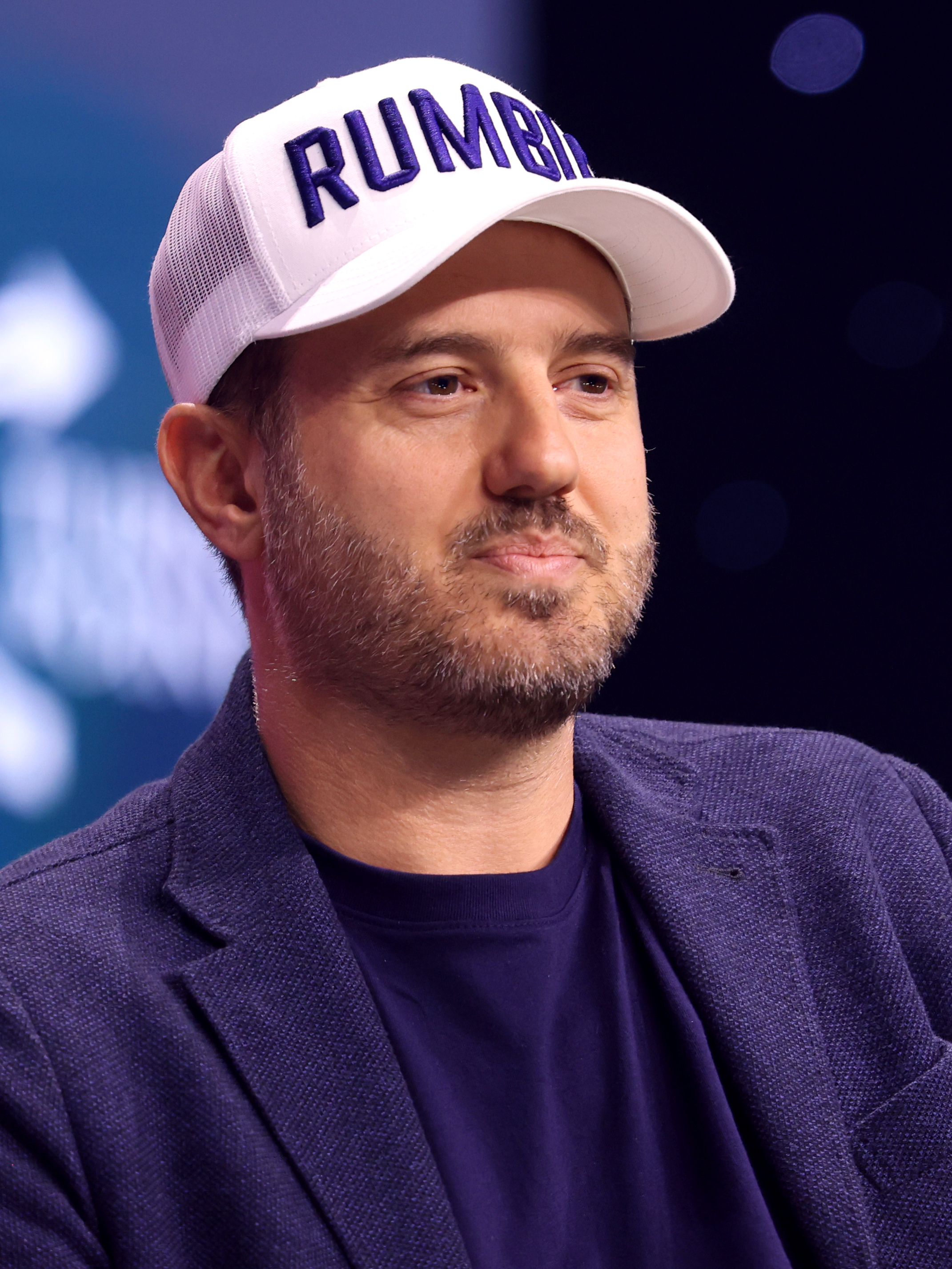
- Citizenship: Canadian
- Education: University of Toronto Mississauga
- Occupation: Entrepreneur
- Years active: 2009-present
- Known for: Founding Rumble
- Board member of: Rumble

Chris Pavlovski is a Canadian technology entrepreneur who is best known as the founder and chief executive officer of the video platform Rumble.

== Early life ==
He grew up in the Greater Toronto Area and began building websites as a teenager. Pavlovski attended the University of Toronto Mississauga between 2001 and 2006. He briefly worked as a network administrator at Microsoft before launching his own companies.

== Career ==
In 2001, Pavlovski founded Jolted (later Jolt) Media Group in Toronto, serving as its chief executive. While leading Jolt Media Group, he was appointed in 2010 as director of marketing for Next Giant Leap, a private space exploration company competing for the Google Lunar X Prize. In 2011, he co-founded Cosmic Development, an IT and software services firm which grew to over 150 employees. Pavlovski was a regional finalist for the Ernst & Young Entrepreneur of the Year Award in 2010. Between 2009 and 2012 Pavlovski served as director of marketing for NASA's Next Giant Leap.

In October 2013, Pavlovski launched Rumble, a Toronto-based video hosting and cloud platform, as an alternative (alt-tech) to YouTube with lighter content moderation policies. Rumble's monthly visitors rose from 1.6 million in 2021 to 31.9 million in 2022. In 2021, Rumble secured new investments from Peter Thiel and JD Vance. Later that year, Pavlovski announced a merger with the special-purpose acquisition company CF Acquisition Corp VI; the combined company began trading on Nasdaq (ticker RUM) in 2022 with an implied enterprise value of about $2.1 billion. Pavlovski also partnered with Trump Media & Technology Group for hosting Truth Social on Rumble's cloud platform.

Pavlovski became a billionaire in January 2025 after Rumble's stock increased in price by nearly 190% in 2024.

== Private life ==
Pavlovski is Canadian by birth and of Macedonian descent. He serves on the board of Macedonia 2025, a non-profit organization focused on economic and educational development in North Macedonia.

He is a critic of internet censorship. In 2024, Pavlovski criticized the arrest of Telegram founder Pavel Durov in France as a "red line."
