= Giancarlo Devasini =

Italian entrepreneur

- Born: 1964 (age 61–62); Turin, Italy
- Citizenship: Italy
- Education: University of Milan
- Title: Co-Founder of Tether

Giancarlo Devasini (born 1964) is an Italian businessman and former physician. He is the chief financial officer of Bitfinex and co-owner of Tether.

According to Forbes, he is the richest person in Italy and was ranked the 24th-richest person in the world, with an estimated net worth of $89.3 billion as of July 2026. He has been reported to hold an approximately 45% stake in Tether.

== Early life and education ==
Born in Turin, Devasini graduated from the University of Milan with a degree in medicine in 1990.

== Career ==
=== Early career and business activities ===
Devasini began working as a cosmetic surgeon, performing plastic surgery. However, he retired from medicine after two years and started working in the IT industry, where he founded several companies specializing in the distribution of computer components. He also founded a food delivery company called "Delitzia", which included a blog about organic food. In 1995, he was accused of product piracy by Microsoft. To avoid prosecution and continue his business, he agreed to pay a fine of one million Italian liras. Several of his companies later went bankrupt.

=== Involvement in cryptocurrency and Bitfinex ===
Devasini later became involved in the cryptocurrency sector and participated in the founding of the Bitfinex trading platform in 2012. When Bitfinex ran into financial difficulties in 2018, Devasini used Tether's reserves to keep Bitfinex afloat. Due to this conflict of interest, he paid a fine of US$18.5 million in New York in 2021 to settle a lawsuit. In 2026, Tether was described as a highly profitable company that paid $10.9 billion in dividends in 2025, with its USDT stablecoin valued at approximately $184 billion and dominating the market for dollar-pegged digital assets.

=== Activities in Lugano ===
Between 2017 and 2023, Devasini lived in the city of Lugano in Ticino and established contacts with local politicians. Tether has also signed a memorandum of understanding with the city of Lugano to promote cryptocurrencies and blockchain technology.
