= Smart mattress =

Technology enhanced mattress

A smart mattress is a mattress that has sensors to monitor sleep patterns. Products can take the form of mattress covers, mattress pads, or the entire mattress.
