= Blackrock Neurotech =

Blackrock Neurotech is a United States-based neurotechnology company which develops brain–computer interface (BCI) devices.

The company was founded in 2008 in Salt Lake City.

In 2024, Tether Limited invested US$200 million into the company.

The company's outputs broadly develop the field of BCI software, and include research in clinical neuroscience and data science, software, algorithms, and hardware device engineering.

An example product is a BCI to support a man with amyotrophic lateral sclerosis in using computer-assisted speech devices.
