= Tether Limited =

Financial technology company

Tether Limited Inc.
- Type: Private
- Industry: Cryptocurrency
- Founded: 2014; 12 years ago
- Founders: Brock Pierce; Reeve Collins; Craig Sellars
- Headquarters: San Salvador, El Salvador
- Area served: Worldwide
- Key people: Paolo Ardoino (CEO)
- Products: Cryptocurrencies
- Net income: ▲US$13 billion (2024)
- Number of employees: ca. 200 (mid-2025)
- Website: tether.to

Tether Limited is a financial technology company that issues the Tether stablecoin (USDT), the world’s largest stablecoin by market capitalization. Founded in 2014, Tether pioneered the concept of fiat-backed digital currencies pegged 1:1 to traditional currencies (initially the U.S. dollar). USDT has become a key source of liquidity in the cryptocurrency market, with over $170 billion in tokens circulating as of 2025. Tether Limited is privately owned (under parent company iFinex Inc., which also owns the crypto exchange Bitfinex) and has grown into one of the most valuable fintech companies; in 2025 it was reportedly seeking to raise capital at a valuation of around $500 billion, which would place it among the world’s most valuable firms.

Tether Limited is now structured as a fully owned subsidiary of Tether Holdings El Salvador S.A. de C.V., a parent company domiciled in El Salvador, reflecting the firm’s shift of its corporate base and strategic expansion into the Salvadoran fintech ecosystem.

== History ==
Tether’s origins trace back to Realcoin, a startup co-founded in July 2014 by Brock Pierce, Reeve Collins, and Craig Sellars. Realcoin launched a dollar-pegged digital token built on the Omni (Mastercoin) protocol, aiming to provide a stable cryptocurrency backed by reserves. In November 2014, the company rebranded as Tether to better reflect its mission of “tethering” digital tokens to real-world currency value. Around the same time, Tether announced partnerships with crypto businesses, including a major Hong Kong exchange, Bitfinex, to integrate USDT for fiat-on-blockchain transactions. By early 2015, Tether’s U.S. dollar token (USDT) and later a euro-pegged token (EURT) began trading, marking some of the first widely used stablecoins in the industry.

In 2020, the company expanded its offerings by launching Tether Gold (XAU₮), a token backed by physical gold bullion stored in Switzerland.

USDT’s market share also surged over competitors in the aftermath of the 2020–2021 crypto boom and events like the 2022 collapse of the TerraUSD stablecoin (whose failure underscored demand for fully reserved tokens). By mid-2023, USDT’s market capitalization reached new highs (around $83–84 billion at that time) and Tether reported large profits from its reserve investments.

In October 2023, Tether’s CTO Paolo Ardoino was elevated to CEO of the company, succeeding Jan Ludovicus van der Velde in that role. Under Ardoino’s leadership, Tether announced it would establish a formal headquarters in El Salvador – its first-ever physical head office – after obtaining a license under El Salvador’s Digital Asset Issuance law. The relocation from the company’s longtime base in the British Virgin Islands was intended to leverage El Salvador’s crypto-friendly stance (El Salvador being the first nation to adopt Bitcoin as legal tender).

In August 2025, the firm disclosed it is developing a U.S.-domiciled stablecoin called USAT (tentatively pegged to the U.S. dollar) aimed at U.S. residents. The USAT token would be issued under a regulated framework in the United States, in parallel to USDT which is not officially available to U.S. users. This initiative came as the regulatory environment for stablecoins in the U.S. began to ease under the Second Trump administration.

By late 2025, Tether’s growth had positioned it as a crypto industry giant. In September 2025, news outlets reported that Tether was in talks to raise $15–20 billion from strategic investors for roughly a 3% stake, implying a valuation on the order of $500 billion for the company.

Following a major security breach of Binance involving cryptocurrency assets valued at an estimated US$6.3 billion in October 2026, the largest cryptocurrency theft on record at that time, Tether froze approximately US$1.57 billion in related assets.

== Activities and products ==
Tether’s core business is issuing asset-pegged stablecoins that aim to maintain a one-to-one value with their reference asset. Its flagship product is Tether (USDT), a U.S. dollar–pegged cryptocurrency originally launched on the Bitcoin-based Omni Layer and later on networks like Ethereum and Tron. USDT is used globally as a proxy for USD in crypto trading, payments, and transfers, helping traders avoid volatility when moving between crypto-assets and exchanges. As of September 2025, USDT’s circulating supply exceeded $170 billion, accounting for roughly two-thirds of all stablecoin value in circulation. In addition to USDT, Tether Limited has introduced several other fiat-pegged tokens. It launched a euro-linked stablecoin EUR₮ (Euro Tether) and an offshore Chinese yuan–pegged CNH₮ (offshore RMB) in its early years, followed by a Mexican peso stablecoin MXN₮ in 2022 to serve Latin American markets. Tether also offers a commodity-backed token Tether Gold (XAU₮), unveiled in January 2020, which represents ownership of one troy ounce of physical gold stored in vaults.

=== Acquisitions and investments ===
In the early 2020s, Tether began expanding its activities beyond stablecoins. The company has stated it would allocate a portion of its excess operational profits to Bitcoin and infrastructure investment. In 2023, Tether invested in sustainable Bitcoin mining projects, launching operations in countries such as Uruguay to generate renewable energy and mine Bitcoin as a diversification of its business. That year Tether also made a strategic investment in CityPay.io, a payments processor in Georgia, to foster USDT adoption for payments at merchants (CityPay enabled USDT as a payment option at hundreds of shops and restaurants).

In November 2023, Tether announced that it plans to invest about half a billion dollars over the next six months to become one of the world's top bitcoin miners. That investment includes part of a $610 million credit facility that Tether had extended to publicly traded bitcoin mining company Northern Data AG after acquiring shares in the Frankfurt-based firm in September.

Tether agreed in May 2024 to purchase a stake in Bitcoin miner Bitdeer and has backed startups in communication and data storage via affiliated firms for a price of $100 million.

In December 2024, Tether announced a $775 million investment in Rumble, an alternative video hosting platform known for its predominantly right-wing user base.

== Investors and ownership ==
Tether Limited is ultimately owned by iFinex Inc., a privately held company initially incorporated in the British Virgin Islands that also owns the Bitfinex cryptocurrency exchange. For most of its history Tether did not rely on traditional venture capital funding; instead, its ownership has been concentrated among its founding executives and affiliated companies. Giancarlo Devasini, Tether’s co-founder and longtime Chief Financial Officer, is the single largest shareholder – he is reported to hold roughly a 40–47% stake in the company. Devasini, a former plastic surgeon turned crypto entrepreneur, has been described as the financial architect of Tether’s operations, and his stake was valued in the billions of dollars as Tether’s valuation climbed (Forbes estimated Devasini’s net worth at $22+ billion in 2025). The remaining ownership is split among other top executives. Jan Ludovicus van der Velde, who served as CEO of Tether’s parent iFinex, and Paolo Ardoino, Tether’s Chief Technology Officer (later CEO), have each been reported to own company shares worth approximately $1.8 billion as of 2023. Stuart Hoegner, Tether’s general counsel, also holds an equity stake (valued around $1.2 billion). Christopher Harborne, the British-Thai billionaire, also owns approximately 12% of Tether Limited's shares.

Because Tether Limited remains a private company, detailed ownership percentages are not publicly disclosed beyond these rough estimates. The company’s close ties to Bitfinex (many Tether principals simultaneously held roles at Bitfinex) have drawn scrutiny in the past, but Tether maintains that it observes corporate separations between the exchange and stablecoin operations. The overlap in ownership and management, however, meant that iFinex stakeholders largely controlled Tether throughout its growth.

== Corporate affairs ==
=== Headquarter ===
For much of its history, Tether Limited had no fixed public headquarters, operating through offshore entities. The main corporate entity (Tether Holdings Ltd.) was registered in the British Virgin Islands, and the company also maintained offices or personnel in Hong Kong and other locations in alignment with Bitfinex’s operations. In January 2025, Tether announced it will relocate its domicile to El Salvador, making that country the site of Tether’s first official head office. CEO Paolo Ardoino and several co-founders stated they would establish residence in El Salvador as well, signaling a full commitment to the new base. The company plans to hire approximately 100 local staff over time, while many of its over 100 existing employees worldwide continue to work remote. Tether considered other jurisdictions for a headquarters but noted it lacks regulatory approval in places like the European Union and has “ruled out” the United States for now due to regulatory uncertainties.

=== Leadership ===
Tether’s executive leadership has overlapped with that of Bitfinex’s parent company. Jan Ludovicus van der Velde served as CEO of iFinex (and was a figurehead leader of Tether in its early years), while Giancarlo Devasini has long been Chief Financial Officer and a key decision-maker. Paolo Ardoino, who joined as CTO in 2017, became the public face of Tether’s technology and community outreach; he was promoted to Chief Executive Officer of Tether in late 2023. In March 2025, Tether appointed a new Chief Financial Officer, Simon McWilliams, and elevated Giancarlo Devasini to the role of Chairman of the company’s board. In September 2025 former Trump administration official Bo Hines was named CEO of Tether U.S., the company's US arm.

=== Finances ===
By the end of 2024, Tether reported holding an all-time high of $113 billion in U.S. Treasuries (directly and indirectly) among its assets, as backing for its USDT stablecoin, making it one of the largest holders of Treasury bills globally. These figures come from Tether’s quarterly attestation reports, which are signed off by the accounting firm BDO Italia. An attestation dated January 2025 showed Tether earned over $13 billion in net profits for 2024 amid rising interest rates on its dollar reserves.

Tether states that the vast majority of its U.S. dollar reserves are custodied with the Wall Street broker Cantor Fitzgerald – whose former CEO and current US Commerce Secretary Howard Lutnick is an advocate of digital assets – and that it maintains accounts with several banks for liquidity purposes.

== Controversies and legal issues ==
In 2017, Tether promised regular audits of its holdings; however, in January 2018 the company’s relationship with its auditor (Friedman LLP) dissolved without a completed audit, heightening concerns about the backing of USDT. During the same period, the closely related Bitfinex exchange encountered banking difficulties and lost access to $850 million in client funds entrusted to a payment processor. In 2019 the New York Attorney General (NYAG) investigated Tether and Bitfinex, alleging that Bitfinex covered the shortfall by borrowing from Tether’s dollar reserves, thereby impairing USDT’s backing. The dispute was settled in February 2021 when Tether’s parent iFinex agreed to pay an $18.5 million fine to NYAG and to cease trading with New York customers, although the companies admitted no wrongdoing.

Tether’s transparency and reserve practices have been a focus of regulators. In October 2021, the U.S. Commodity Futures Trading Commission (CFTC) fined Tether $41 million for misleading statements about its reserves. The CFTC found that for certain periods in 2016–2018, Tether had less fiat currency in reserve than the amount of USDT in circulation, contradicting its past public claims that every token was fully backed.

In October 2023, The Wall Street Journal published claims that USDT was used by criminal organizations such as drug traffickers and terrorist financiers, citing unnamed officials; the report also suggested the U.S. Justice Department was investigating Tether’s compliance controls. Tether forcefully denied these allegations, calling the WSJ report “based on pure speculation” and stating that the company had no knowledge of any such investigation.
