= Neura Robotics =

German robotics company

Neura Robotics GmbH
- Type: Private
- Industry: Robotics
- Founded: March 26, 2019; 7 years ago (as Han's Robot Germany GmbH)
- Founder: David Reger
- Headquarters: Metzingen, Germany
- Key people: David Reger (CEO)
- Products: Cognitive robots, collaborative robots, humanoid robots, autonomous mobile robots
- Number of employees: 1,100+ (2025)
- Subsidiaries: Neura Mobile Robotics GmbH (formerly ek robotics); Neura Electronics GmbH (formerly B.A.H. Industrial Solutions)
- Website: neura-robotics.com

Neura Robotics (stylized as NEURA Robotics) is a German robotics company headquartered in Metzingen, Baden-Württemberg. The company develops collaborative robots, autonomous mobile robots, and humanoid robots designed to operate alongside humans.

== History ==
The company was founded in March 2019 as Han's Robot Germany GmbH by David Reger, who had previously built up the robotics division of the Swiss company Mabi AG. In November 2020, the company rebranded as Neura Robotics and announced its first products, including the LARA collaborative robot. Company headquarters, software, and sensor development were located in Metzingen, with hardware development initially in Hamburg.

In 2021, Neura Robotics launched MAiRA (Multi-Sensing Intelligent Robotic Assistant). The company raised US$86 million the same year. At Automatica 2022, it exhibited a broader portfolio including the MiPA personal assistant robot and the MAV autonomous mobile robot, and presented the concept for its 4NE-1 humanoid robot.

In July 2023, the company raised US$55 million to expand research and development, grow its business in Asia and the United States, and increase manufacturing capacity.

In January 2025, Neura Robotics raised €120 million (US$123.3 million) in Series B funding. At the time, the company reported that it had doubled its workforce to more than 300 employees. By mid-2025, the company reported approximately 600 employees.

In May 2025, the business operations of B.A.H. Industrial Solutions GmbH, a control cabinet construction, industrial assembly, and quality inspection company based in Bösingen founded in 2012, were acquired and taken over as Neura Electronics GmbH, which manufactures control cabinets, sensors, and automation systems with more than 130 employees.

In September 2025, Neura Robotics joined the "Made for Germany" initiative, a group of more than 100 companies founded in July 2025 to promote growth and competitiveness in Germany.

In October 2025, Neura Robotics acquired ek robotics GmbH, a manufacturer of automated guided vehicles and autonomous mobile robots, out of self-administered insolvency proceedings. Following the acquisition, it was renamed Neura Mobile Robotics GmbH, with the ek robotics brand retained. At the time of the acquisition, Neura Robotics employed more than 700 people.

Also in October 2025, Neura Robotics acquired the development division of Huber Automotive AG, an insolvent vehicle-electronics supplier based in Mühlhausen im Täle specializing in control units, battery management, and energy storage systems. By late October 2025, the company employed more than 1,100 people.

In December 2025, Neura Robotics opened a development site in the Seefeld district of Zürich, Switzerland, where development of the 4NE1 humanoid robot was centralized.

At CES 2026, the company introduced a quadruped robot and the 4NE1 Mini, a smaller version of its humanoid robot.

In March 2026, Bloomberg News reported that Neura Robotics was raising approximately €1 billion (US$1.2 billion) in a Series C funding round backed by stablecoin issuer Tether Holdings, valuing the company at about €4 billion. In June 2026, Neura Robotics announced a Series C round of up to US$1.4 billion with several of the company's strategic partners co-investing. As part of the investment, Tether said its self-custodial wallet development kit and its edge AI runtime would be integrated into Neura's robotics platforms and the Neuraverse ecosystem.

== Products ==
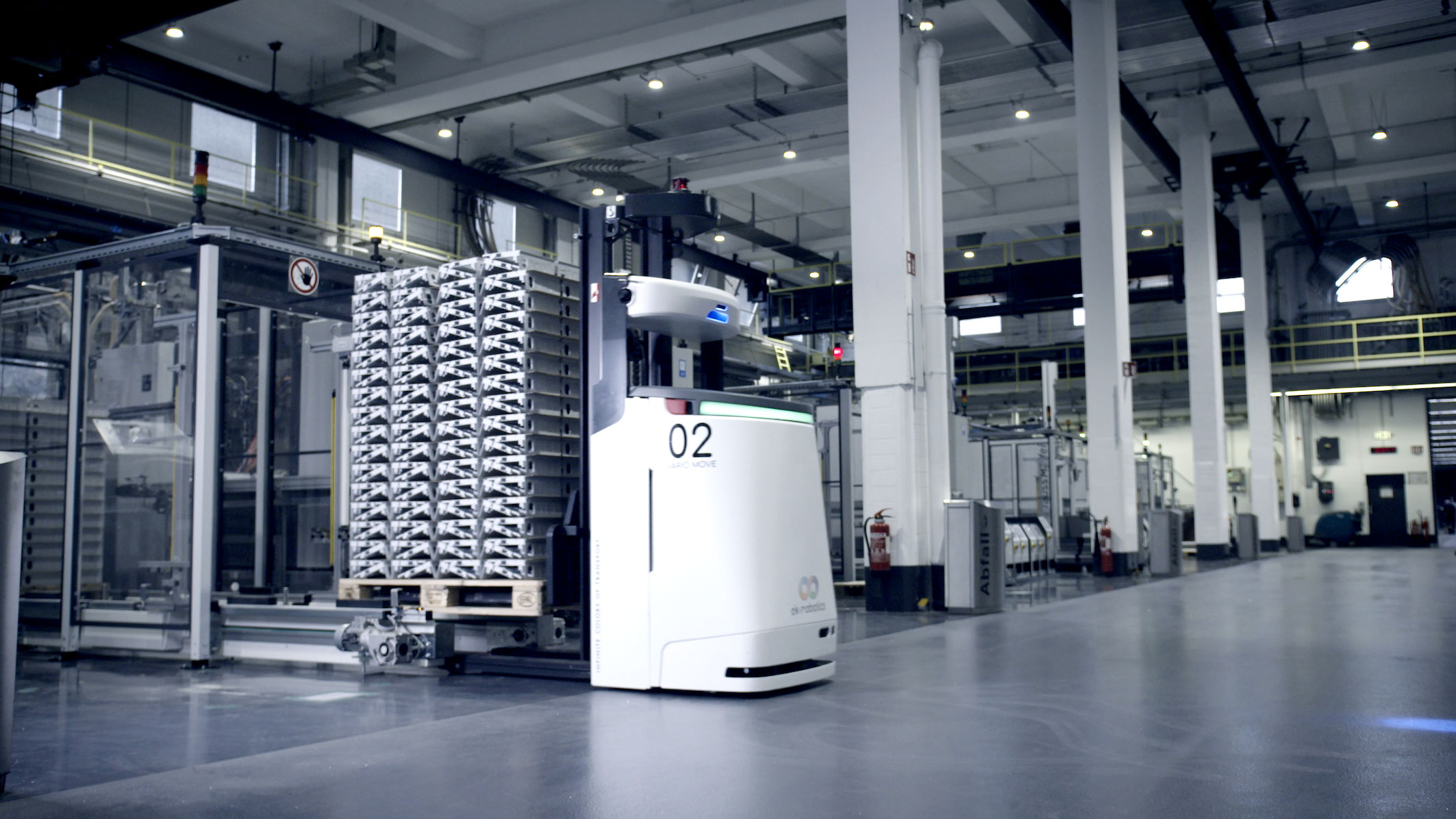
A VARIO MOVE automated guided vehicle by ek robotics, which became Neura Mobile Robotics in 2025

- MAiRA: a collaborative robot launched in 2021, marketed as a "cognitive" robot with integrated 3D vision and voice recognition for object recognition and autonomous grasping. A larger variant, MAiRA XL with a 35 kg payload, was presented at Automatica 2023.
- LARA (Lightweight Agile Robotic Assistant): a collaborative robot arm introduced in November 2020 for manufacturing, healthcare, logistics, and service applications.
- MAV (Multi-Sensing Autonomous Vehicle): an autonomous mobile robot for intralogistics, exhibited at Automatica 2022.
- MiPA (My Intelligent Personal Assistant): a household and service robot first shown as a concept in 2022; Neura Robotics opened reservations and announced its market launch at Automatica 2025.
- 4NE1 (pronounced "for anyone"): a humanoid robot first presented as a concept in 2022. A prototype performing household tasks was demonstrated in mid-2024. The third generation premiered at Automatica 2025.
- Quadruped and 4NE1 Mini: legged robots introduced at CES 2026, the latter aimed at education and research.

=== Neuraverse ===
At Automatica 2025, Neura Robotics launched Neuraverse, a software ecosystem for its robots that the company compares to an app store, intended to let different robot types share learned skills and receive applications and updates.

== Partnerships ==
In 2023, Kawasaki Robotics introduced its CL Series of collaborative robots, developed with and "powered by" Neura Robotics' robot platform. The series comprises four models with payloads from 3 kg to 10 kg, designed and built in Germany.

In 2024, Neura Robotics joined the Nvidia Humanoid Robot Developer Program, using Nvidia's Isaac GR00T platform for the development of its humanoid robots. At Automatica 2025, the company presented a collaboration with SAP and Nvidia combining its robots with SAP's enterprise AI and Nvidia's digital twin technology, and announced plans for physical training centers, called "NEURA Gyms", in which robots generate training data from real-world application scenarios to complement simulation-based training.

In November 2025, Neura Robotics and Schaeffler announced a technology partnership covering the joint development and supply of actuators for humanoid robots. Schaeffler also agreed to deploy Neura humanoid robots in its global production network, with plans to integrate a mid-four-digit number of units by 2035, and to contribute production data to the Neuraverse ecosystem.

In January 2026, Neura Robotics and Bosch announced a strategic technology and development partnership to industrialize humanoid robotics in Germany. The companies plan to collect real-world movement and environmental data in Bosch production facilities using sensor suits, co-develop AI-based software and user interfaces, and explore Bosch supplying components and supporting assembly and motor production for Neura's humanoid robots.

In March 2026, Neura Robotics and the Munich Institute of Robotics and Machine Intelligence (MIRMI) of the Technical University of Munich announced the "TUM RoboGym", a training center for physical AI at the TUM Convergence Center at Munich Airport.

In March 2026, Neura Robotics announced a strategic collaboration with Qualcomm Technologies to develop robotics and physical AI platforms, including the use of Qualcomm's Dragonwing IQ10 robotics processors as reference designs in Neura's robots. In 2026, the company also announced a partnership with Amazon Web Services to host its Neuraverse platform and support cloud-based robot training.
