= Rumble (company) =

American video hosting and cloud services company

- Website type: Video hosting service
- Traded as: Nasdaq: RUM
- Founded: October 30, 2013; 13 years ago
- Headquarters: Longboat Key, Florida, U.S.
- Area served: Worldwide (except Brazil, China, Crimea, France, Indonesia, North Korea, and Russia)
- Founder: Chris Pavlovski
- Industry: Internet; Social media
- Products: Rumble Viral; Locals
- Services: Video hosting service
- Revenue: ▲US$95.5 million (2024)
- Parent: Rumble Inc.
- Website: rumble.com
- Advertising: Rumble Ads
- Registration: Optional
- Users: ▼67 million MAU (September 2024)
- Launched: October 30, 2013; 13 years ago
- Current status: Active
- ASN: 399647

Rumble, Inc. is an American AI, infrastructure, and video company headquartered in Longboat Key, Florida. It was founded in 2013 by Canadian tech entrepreneur Chris Pavlovski.

After the 2020 United States presidential election, the site became a major platform for news and influencers on the right and far-right. Rumble developed ties with Donald Trump after he was de-platformed in the wake of the January 6 United States Capitol attack, helping attract a $25 million investment from Peter Thiel and JD Vance. Trump's Truth Social platform migrated to the site for hosting in 2022.

Described as alt-tech, Rumble remains unprofitable, with their user base peaking in 2022 at 80 million. It rebranded as RUM Group Inc. in 2026, expanding into cloud/GPU and AI infrastructure.

== History ==
=== Early years (2013–2019) ===
Rumble was founded in Toronto on October 30, 2013, by Chris Pavlovski, a Canadian businessman whose family is from Macedonia. The same year, Pavlovski also co-founded Cosmic Development, an IT and software services company that does business in Canada, North Macedonia and Serbia. Ryan Milnes, the co-founder and CEO of Cosmic Development, serves on Rumble's board, while Cosmic Development provides content-moderation services for Rumble. Vladimir Novachki, Cosmic Development's former CTO, now serves as the CTO of the Trump Media & Technology Group (TMTG).

Rumble was originally founded as an alternative to YouTube for independent vloggers and smaller content creators. Pavlovski founded the platform after seeing that Google was prioritizing influencers on YouTube over independent content creators. In its early years, Rumble was a lesser-known website. During that time, it featured videos from Reuters, America's Funniest Home Videos, E. W. Scripps Company, and even Snopes.

By 2017, Rumble was receiving increasing media attention for its work with content creators and its use of machine learning and AI to manage content licensing. That year, it reported a digital media presence of 300,000 videos, and 60,000 content creators. It also claimed to reach 100 million active users and generate more than 250 million views per month.

=== Political identity, antitrust lawsuit (2020–2021) ===
The platform received a large influx of viewership from 2020, at the start of the COVID-19 pandemic. Monthly visitors rose from 1.6 million in 2020, to 31.9 million by 2021. Just before the 2020 United States presidential election, Pavloski invited Republican politician Devin Nunes to join the platform. Nunes, who accused YouTube of overly censoring his channel, began posting on Rumble, with other prominent conservatives, such as Dinesh D'Souza, Dan Bongino, Sean Hannity, and Representative Jim Jordan, following soon after. In June 2021, former US president Donald Trump joined Rumble in preparation for recording his Ohio campaign rally.

In the first nine months of 2021, Rumble generated more than $6.5 million in revenue, mostly from advertisements; however, it was not profitable. On January 11, 2021, Rumble filed an antitrust lawsuit against Google over its search algorithms, seeking damages exceeding $2 billion. Rumble alleged that Google manipulated its algorithm so as to favor Google's own YouTube over Rumble in Google search results. Rumble alleged that this direct manipulation reduced its viewership and resulted in lower advertising revenues for their company. In August 2022, a California judge said that Rumble's case against Google can proceed.

=== Funding, Truth Social hosting, public company (2021–2024) ===
Rumble first began to develop a relationship with US president Donald Trump after he was de-platformed in the wake of the January 6 United States Capitol attack. Soon after, the company received $25 million in backing from Peter Thiel and then-Senator JD Vance through Narya Capital in May 2021, with that round of funding valuing Rumble at around $500 million. In October 2021, Rumble acquired Locals. On December 14, 2021, TMTG announced that it entered a "wide-ranging technology and cloud services agreement" with Rumble in a statement that also stated that Rumble would operate part of Truth Social as well as TMTG. Also in December 2021, Rumble challenged a New York law prohibiting hate speech on social media.

In August 2022, Rumble announced plans to provide an online advertising platform known as Rumble Ads, with Truth Social as its first publisher. Rumble became a publicly traded company in September 2022, trading under ticker RUM on the Nasdaq, after merging with a special-purpose acquisition company. Howard Lutnick, the CEO of Cantor Fitzgerald, helped broker the deal. In May 2023, Rumble acquired the podcasting platform CallIn.

Rumble moved its headquarters to Longboat Key, Florida, in 2023. That same year, Rumble was granted exclusive rights to the online stream of the Republican presidential primary debates. In 2024, the U.S. Securities and Exchange Commission confirmed that Rumble was under an active investigation, the exact nature of which is unknown. Early that year, Pavlovski stated that the "short-lived investigation was part of a coordinated ploy by short sellers manipulating the market." The U.S. Securities and Exchange Commission later cleared Rumble.

The site became a significant platform for news and influencers on the right during the 2024 United States presidential election. That november, creator Guy "Dr Disrespect" Beahm signed a deal to produce both free and exclusive content on the platform and head Rumble gaming's division. The deal included equity in the company for Beahm.

=== Rebranding (2025–) ===
Shortly after the 2024 election, Cantor Fitzgerald helped facilitate a $775 million investment from crypto company Tether. Pavlovski, the CEO of Rumble, became a billionaire in January 2025 after Rumble's stock increased in price by nearly 190 percent in 2024. Rumble is largely unprofitable, with their user base peaking in 2022 at 80 million. In 2025, Rumble announced they were acquiring German high-performance computing infrastructure company Northern Data for $767 million. The company was previously described as an online video platform, web hosting, and cloud services business. In June 2026, Rumble Inc rebranded as RUM Group Inc, an AI, infrastructure, and video company. They added a new unit known as Quake AI, which includes 22,000 GPUs in nine data centers with an estimated 200 MW of "unmonetized energy capacity", according to Pavlovski.

== Revenue and restrictions ==
Rumble allows its users to generate revenue from their videos. Users upload videos that are licensed to Rumble's partners, after which money made from those videos is directly deposited into the Rumble account of the user. According to the platform's terms and conditions, Rumble forbids pornography, harassment, racism, antisemitism, and copyright infringement. The platform also prohibits illegal content. Rumble's policies have been criticized by other alt-tech platforms for not allowing antisemitism and racism.

== Locals ==
Locals
- Founded: 2019
- Owner: Rumble
- Website: Locals

Locals Technology Inc., also referred to as locals.com, is a US creator crowdfunding site cofounded by conservative commentator Dave Rubin and Assaf Lev. It started in 2019 and is based in Miami. The site was founded after Rubin and Jordan Peterson left Patreon in response to its banning of Carl Benjamin for calling alt-right trolls "white n****rs" in an interview on another person's YouTube channel.

The site deviates from the advertising and views model adopted by traditional social media, in favor of a paywall approach. Assaf Lev is the president and CEO; Lev was previously an executive at QualiSystems. Andrew Conru is also a director. Locals was acquired by Rumble in October 2021.

== Users and content ==
After the 2020 United States presidential election, Rumble became popular among conservatives, Trump supporters, and extremists, including the far-right. Pavlovski, the CEO, encouraged users to join the platform, promoting it as "immune from cancel culture." The site has been described as part of the alt-tech network.

Using data from February 2021, researchers noted that several content creators have gained a receptive audience on Rumble after their content was pulled from YouTube or Facebook. They include Del Bigtree, Sherri Tenpenny, and Simone Gold. According to a June 2021 article from Slate, "Pavlovski has recently become more outspoken in accusing Big Tech of censorship and now actively courts prominent conservatives and intellectual dark web figures to join Rumble." It also hosted Truth Social as of June 2022. In August 2021, Rumble reached agreements with former Democratic Representative Tulsi Gabbard and The Intercept founder Glenn Greenwald to start posting their videos to the site.

As of August 15, 2022, Rumble reported 78 million monthly active users (MAU). That month, after being banned from most other platforms for hate speech and harmful conduct, kickboxer and social media personality Andrew Tate began posting on Rumble. Tate's move coincided with a significant increase in downloads of the Rumble app. Other prominent figures to join in 2021 include far-right podcaster Nick Fuentes, who has become one of their biggest streamers.

According to an August 2022 Reuters article, Rumble is "better-funded" and "more mainstream" than its competitors BitChute and Odysee. Reuters states that all three platforms "include misinformation and conspiracy theories", with Rumble "moderating more content" than the other two. Unlike BitChute and Odysee, Rumble does suppress results when searching for some keywords associated with hate speech or extremism; however, the content itself is still accessible.

According to a May 2022 Pew Research Center study, 20% of American adults have heard of Rumble, while 2% regularly got their news from Rumble. Of regular users, 76% identified as Republicans or were Republican-leaning, while 22% identified as Democrats or were Democratic-leaning. Around 90% of Rumble users believed news hosted on the site was mostly accurate. Most of Rumble's 200 most prominent accounts at that time were run by individuals, 22% of whom had been banned from other social media platforms. 55% of these prominent accounts also had accounts on other websites such as YouTube. A June 2022 review of posts by Pew Research from Rumble's 200 most prominent accounts found that 49% had posted about guns or gun rights, 48% had posted about abortion, 44% had posted about LGBTQ topics (specifically the LGBTQ grooming conspiracy theory), 42% had posted about the January 6 Capitol attack, and 26% had posted about extreme vaccine skepticism.

Following the 2022 Russian invasion of Ukraine, Rumble did not follow other social media platforms in banning Russian state media from their site. In November 2022, Rumble was blocked in France, after their refusal to comply with the country's demand for the removal of Russian state media accounts.

In early 2023, Rumble began hosting live broadcasts for sports leagues owned by Thrill One Sports & Entertainment such as Nitrocross, Street League Skateboarding, and Power Slap.

Rumble removed access to its platform in Brazil in 2023 due to legal orders from the country to suspend the accounts of some content creators. It went back online in Brazil in early 2025, citing the country's move to "rescind their censorship order on Rumble." On February 19, 2025, Rumble joined a lawsuit against Brazil's Supreme Federal Court justice Alexandre de Moraes for a claim of illegally censoring right-wing media on social media. On February 21, 2025, Moraes ordered the suspension of Rumble for intentionally refusing to comply with court orders, including refusal to remove the account of Brazilian fugitive Allan dos Santos.

== See also ==
- Comparison of video hosting services
- List of online video platforms
