= HPE =

HPE may refer to:

== Cars ==
- Lancia Beta HPE, introduced 1975
- Lancia Delta HPE, introduced 1995

== Organizations ==
- Hennessey Performance Engineering, American hypercar manufacturer
- Hewlett Packard Enterprise, an American technology company spun-off from Hewlett-Packard in 2015
- United Alignment of Nationalists (Greek: Ηνωμένη Παράταξις Εθνικοφρόνων), a Greek political alliance
- Êzîdxan Protection Force (Kurdish: Hêza Parastina Êzîdxanê, HPÊ)

== Science and technology ==
- High-pressure electrolysis
- Holoprosencephaly, a cephalic disorder

== Other uses ==
- High Point Enterprise, a US newspaper
- Hope railway station (Wales) (station code), in Flintshire, Wales
