= Dadvan Yousuf =

Kurdish entrepreneur

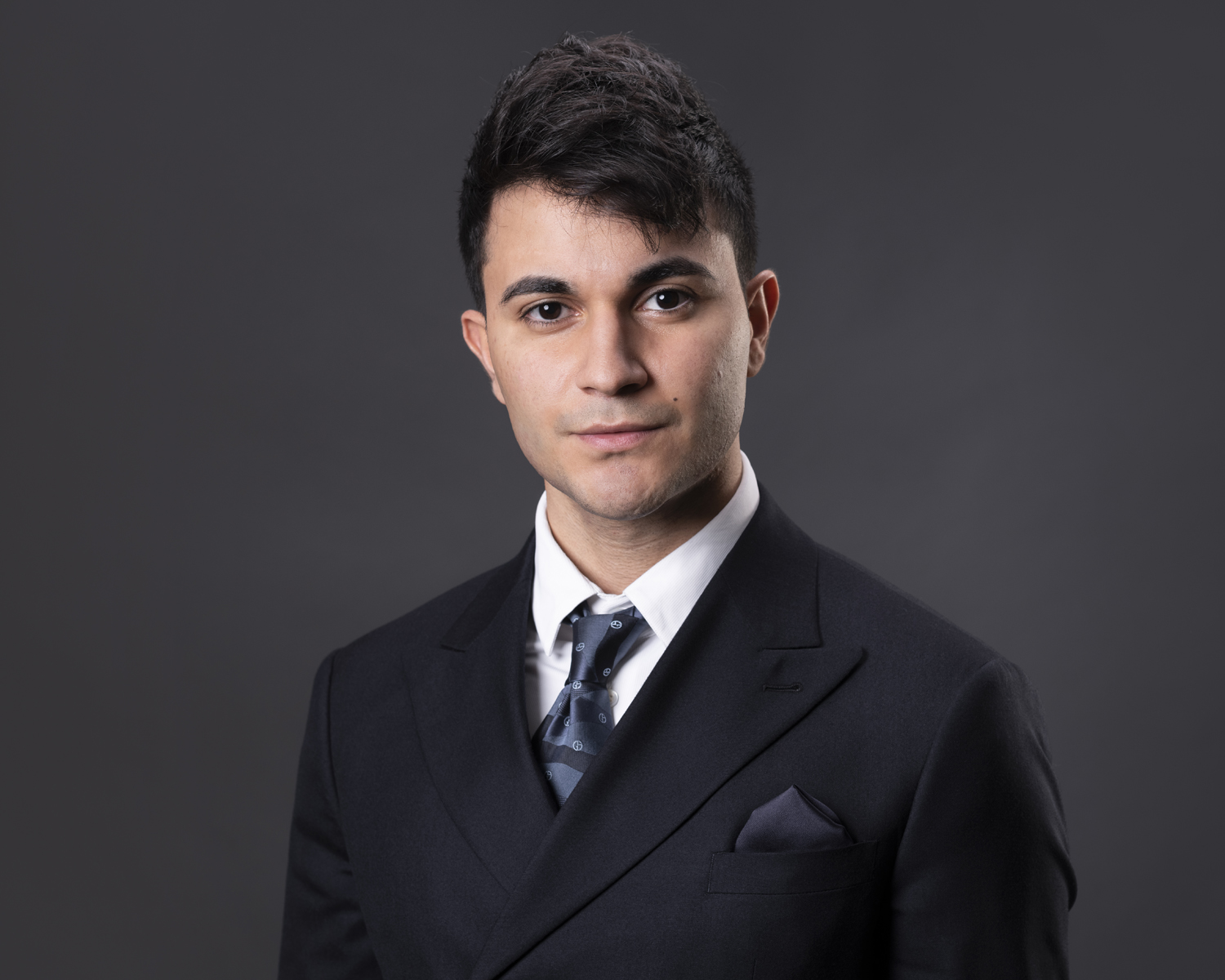
- Yousuf in 2021

International Trade Commissioner of Nauru
- Incumbent
- Assumed office April 2026
- Appointed by: President David Adeang

Personal details
- Born: Dadvan Ismat Yousuf Yousuf; April 9, 2000 (age 26) Zakho, Kurdistan Region, Iraq
- Citizenship: Iraq, Nauru
- Education: Swiss Federal University for Vocational Education and Training in Switzerland
- Occupation: Entrepreneur, cryptocurrency investor
- Known for: Early Bitcoin investments; first Kurd and Iraqi to summit Mount Everest
- Awards: Forbes 30 Under 30

Dadvan Ismat Yousuf Yousuf (born 9 April 2000) is a Kurdish-born cryptocurrency investor and businessman. He became known in Switzerland for early investments in bitcoin and other cryptocurrencies and later founded the Dohrnii Foundation, a cryptocurrency education project that issued the DHN token, which reached a fully diluted market capitalization of $15 billion at its peak in 2025. He is considered the youngest Swiss self-made billionaire. In 2021 he was included in the Forbes 30 Under 30 list. According to the Swiss newspaper Blick, Yousuf's net worth was reported at CHF 270 million in 2020, including CHF 189 million in cryptocurrency, while estimates based on market prices suggested his holdings exceeded CHF 1.2 billion. He is the first Kurd and Iraqi to have summited Mount Everest.

In 2026, he was appointed as the first international trade commissioner of the republic of Nauru, supporting the country’s efforts to develop its digital asset sector and expand international investment.

== Early life ==
Yousuf was born in Zakho, Iraqi Kurdistan on April 9, 2000. His father was part of the Peshmerga and fled the country to Switzerland before Yousuf was born. Three years later his mother left the country, together with her three sons. They arrived in Neuenburg, Switzerland, in 2003 where his father had relocated. In 2004, the family was granted refugee status and moved to Ipsach. Yousuf has five younger siblings who were born in Switzerland. In his early years, he showed an interest in the field of finance, particularly on Bitcoin and international money transfers. This interest was partly influenced by difficulties his family faced in transferring money to relatives abroad, which led him to explore alternative financial systems such as cryptocurrencies.

In 2017 he started an apprenticeship at the Swiss Federal University for Vocational Education and Training in Zollikofen.

== Career ==
=== Early cryptocurrency activity ===
At the age of 11, Yousuf sold some of his toys to acquire funds to invest in Bitcoin. With this initial investment, he purchased 10 Bitcoins at a price of €15 and continued to trade in the cryptocurrency. In 2012, he acquired 1000 Bitcoins at a rate of €11,126. In 2016, Yousuf invested in Ethereum, buying 16,000 units at a total cost of €134,000. Yousuf became a multi-millionaire through his cryptocurrency trades, and is considered the youngest Swiss self-made millionaire.

=== Dohrnii Foundation ===
Yousuf founded the Dohrnii Foundation in Zug, Switzerland, in early 2021 to oversee the development of his cryptocurrency software and own cryptocurrency tokens. According to the project’s whitepaper, Dohrnii is designed as a blockchain-based financial education platform incorporating a "learn-to-earn" model in which users are rewarded with DHN tokens for engaging with educational content. It includes an online learning platform and a digital marketplace in which services and products can be accessed or exchanged using the DHN token. An initial coin offering (ICO) was conducted to support the development of the platform and its associated ecosystem. Yousuf later stepped down from his roles within the Dohrnii project, remaining involved only as a representative focusing on long-term strategy and innovation. The project stated that it had become operationally independent from the Dohrnii Foundation and evolved into a community-driven initiative. The DHN token was listed on a decentralised exchange in 2022 through a community-driven initiative led by a decentralized autonomous organisation (DAO). In March 2025, DHN rose sharply in price, increasing from approximately $0.007 to a peak of around $47 within a short period, giving the token a fully diluted market capitalization of approximately $15 billion before falling by about 50% after Ethereum co-founder Vitalik Buterin sold tokens he had received from the DAO on the decentralized exchange Uniswap.

=== Forbes 30 Under 30 ===
In November 2021, Forbes included Yousuf in its "30 Under 30” list. Forbes described him as one of the youngest self-made cryptocurrency millionaires in Switzerland, as well as among the country’s youngest foundation founders and issuers of a digital cryptocurrency. The profile highlighted his role as founder and chief executive officer of the Dohrnii Foundation and noted the project’s focus on cryptocurrency education, artificial intelligence applications, and digital investment management technology.

=== Crowdlitoken ===
In late 2021, Yousuf became chief executive officer and a majority shareholder of Crowdlitoken (Crowdli AG), a Liechtenstein-based fintech company focused on tokenized real-estate investments. The company aimed to provide investors with access to selected properties through blockchain-based digital securities, with entry possible from relatively small amounts (reported as from CHF 100). It had earlier obtained approval from the Liechtenstein Financial Market Authority (FMA) for a tokenized real-estate product described as one of the first in Europe, and later stated that FINMA did not require specific authorization for its distribution in Switzerland. His role included operational leadership and the development of the platform’s investment concept. Following Yousuf’s entry, a commercial property in Heimberg, Switzerland, was added to the company's portfolio, valued at approximately CHF 5.63 million. Yousuf proposed using pre-emption agreements to expand the platform’s property pipeline and highlighted the company’s FMA licence as a key asset. In April 2025, Crowdli AG was acquired by Finexity AG.

=== Arcadia Initiative ===
Yousuf later outlined the “Arcadia Initiative”, a proposed network of autonomous, solar-powered educational hubs intended to expand access to language and financial education in underserved regions. The concept was described in a project whitepaper titled ''Bitcoins Hub: Autonomous Learning for Global Empowerment'', published through Bitcoins.io.

=== International role and activities ===
In April 2026, Yousuf was appointed as the first international trade commissioner of the Pacific state of Nauru. The position was created in the context of the country’s efforts to develop its digital asset sector and attract international investment.

In announcing the appointment, President David Adeang said that Yousuf:

"brings a unique combination of entrepreneurial vision, international network, and deep understanding of digital asset markets."

The role involves representing Nauru in a diplomatic capacity and supporting cross-border engagement with virtual asset service providers, financial institutions, and technology companies seeking to operate within the country's regulatory framework.

The appointment followed the establishment of the Command Ridge Virtual Asset Authority (CRVAA) in 2025, a regulatory body responsible for licensing and overseeing digital asset activities in Nauru.

In July 2026, the Office of the Trade Commissioner of Nauru announced the establishment of the Pacific Digital Assets Forum (PDAF), with Yousuf named as its founding chair. The forum was described as an independent initiative focused on research, education, and policy dialogue on digital assets in the Pacific region.

=== Media appearances and autobiography ===
In early 2022, Yousuf sponsored FC Schaffhausen at the Wefox-Arena. Yousuf’s autobiography, published in October 2022, reflects on his upbringing and early involvement in cryptocurrency. In December 2022, Yousuf participated in the ARD documentary titled "Money Maker", which explored his journey from a refugee child in Kurdistan to becoming a multimillionaire through cryptocurrency investments in Switzerland. In February 2022, Swiss public broadcaster SRF published an investigative report concerning Yousuf’s business activities. Yousuf later filed a criminal complaint for defamation against two SRF journalists. Following appeal proceedings, prosecutors issued summary penalty orders for defamation against the journalists, which SRF accepted without contesting. In 2025, Yousuf and SRF reached an out-of-court settlement concerning the disputed reporting, after which the contested article was removed and SRF issued an apology in connection with a personality rights violation identified in the penalty orders. In May 2026, Yousuf initiated civil and criminal legal proceedings against the Ringier media group over its reporting and filed a claim seeking 100 million Swiss francs in damages and related compensation.

=== FINMA proceedings ===
Yousuf's involvements in cryptocurrency have drawn the attention of the Swiss Financial Market Supervisory Authority. In May 2022, the Dohrnii Foundation was investigated for engaging in various regulated activities, including acting as a securities firm, without obtaining the required FINMA authorization. According to FINMA's enforcement report published in May 2023, the Dohrnii Foundation had sold DHN tokens to approximately 500 private individuals for a total of roughly €3 million through its ICO, while Yousuf personally sold tokens to around 60 individuals for approximately CHF 3.2 million. Following enforcement proceedings by the Swiss Financial Market Supervisory Authority, the Dohrnii Foundation was dissolved in June 2023.

== Views on cryptocurrency ==
In interviews in 2021, Yousuf expressed critical views on parts of the cryptocurrency market, describing many hype-driven tokens as lacking underlying value and attributing the prevalence of scams and pump-and-dump schemes to limited regulation. He stated that stronger oversight could improve transparency for retail investors and emphasised the importance of technological fundamentals when evaluating cryptocurrencies. He also argued in a 2021 interview with Schweizer Monat that cryptocurrencies could contribute to the decentralization of monetary systems and reduce reliance on central banks, while criticising central bank digital currencies for their potential to increase financial surveillance. In a 2022 SRF documentary, Yousuf described cryptocurrency trading as time-intensive and psychologically demanding for many traders, and stated that he later used automated trading systems to reduce the need for constant market monitoring.

== Personal life ==
Yousuf climbed Mount Everest in 2024 and has been described as the first Kurd and Iraqi to reach the summit. Yousuf reached the summit on 20 May 2024 after an expedition lasting approximately 50 days, during which he displayed a Kurdistan flag and a Bitcoin flag at the peak. According to Yousuf, the expedition was intended to draw attention to global disparities in access to financial education.

In 2025, Nauru granted honorary citizenship to Yousuf and his brother. The oath of allegiance was administered during a cabinet ceremony presided over by President David Adeang.

== Books ==
- Vom Flüchtling zum Bitcoin-Millionär. — FinanzBuch Verlag (24 Oct. 2022). — С. 240. — ISBN 978-3959726641
