= Bullish (cryptocurrency exchange) =

Caymanian cryptocurrency exchange

- Type: Public
- Traded as: NYSE: BLSH; Russell 1000 component
- Industry: Cryptocurrency
- Founded: 2020; 6 years ago
- Founders: Brendan Blumer
- Headquarters: George Town, Cayman Islands
- Key people: Thomas W. Farley, Chair & CEO; David W. Bonanno, CFO
- Products: Cryptocurrency exchange
- Net income: ▼ −US$785 million (2025)
- Total assets: ▲US$3.956 billion (2025)
- Total equity: ▲US$3.216 billion (2025)
- Owner: Brendan Blumer (25.89%); Kokuei Yuan (24.09%); Thomas W. Farley (3.45%); Andrew C. Bliss (3.34%); David W. Bonanno (1.23%)
- Number of employees: 414 (2025)
- Subsidiaries: CoinDesk
- Website: bullish.com

Bullish is a cryptocurrency exchange headquartered in George Town, Cayman Islands. It is licensed in Germany, Hong Kong, Gibraltar, and New York State.

== History ==
=== Founding and incorporation (2020–2021) ===
Bullish was founded in 2020 in Hong Kong by Brendan Blumer, who had previously launched Block.one. It began its operations in May 2021. The company was initially seeded by Block.one with 164,000 Bitcoins valued at around US$9.7 billion, US$100 million in cash, and 20 million EOS.IO tokens. It also raised US$300 million from investors including Peter Thiel, Alan Howard, Louis Bacon, Christian Angermayer, and Richard Li. It launched with Thomas Farley as head of the company. At the time of launch, its offerings were in bitcoin, ether, EOS tokens and USD coins. It was structured as a subsidiary Block.one, with Brendan Blumer serving as chairman.

In early 2021, Bullish was awarded a distributed ledger technology license from the Gibraltar Financial Services Commission (GFSC). Bullish was incorporated in the Cayman Islands on June 22, 2021. In November 2021, Bullish officially began operating for a first group of institutional investors, such as Virtu Capital and Amber Group. It initially made $3 billion of its assets available via liquidity pool.

=== IPO and Coindesk (2022–2026) ===
In 2021, Bullish announced plans to become a public company through a US$9 billion merger with a special-purpose acquisition company (SPAC); however, the deal was canceled in December 2022 after the SPAC was unable to secure the necessary approvals. In December 2022, it was announced the Far Peak SPAC, which had raised $550 million in its IPO and was led by Farley, would wind down by March 7, 2023. At the time, Brendan Blumer was Bullish CEO.

In November 2023, the company acquired CoinDesk for approximately US$75 million.

By March 2024, Bullish had handled US$1.25 trillion in total transactions, with products including spot, margin and derivatives trading. It had sold a significant portion of its seed investment from Block.one, but still held over 24,000 Bitcoin worth at the time around $US1.7 billion. It also held $US144 million in dollar-denominated stablecoins.

In July 2024, Block.one reduced its equity stake to below 50%. Farley was CEO, and owned a stake worth US$437 million.

In August 2025, Bullish became a public company via an initial public offering (IPO), raising US$1.1 billion. At the time of the IPO, co-founder and board member Blumer was the largest shareholder, with a 30.1% stake. Kokuei Yuan, also on the board, owned 26.7% stake worth $2.5 billion. CEO Tom Farley owned a stake worth $355 million, at the time.

In May 2026, Bullish agreed to acquire transfer agent Equiniti from Siris Capital for $4.2 billion, including $1.85 billion of assumed debt and $2.35 billion in Bullish stock.
