= Cryptocurrencies in Europe =

The general notion of cryptocurrencies in Europe denotes the processes of legislative regulation, distribution, circulation, and storage of cryptocurrencies in Europe. In April 2023, the EU Parliament passed the Markets in Crypto Act (MiCA) unified legal framework for crypto-assets within the European Union.

== The legality of cryptocurrencies in Europe ==
There are some regulatory policy recommendations for EU states to follow in the course of cryptocurrency adoption and regulatory framework development that are given below in chronological order.

- In 2013, the European Banking Authority (EBA) issued a public warning about the possible risks of virtual currencies.
- In 2014, The EBA issued a decision on virtual currencies, which included a list of more than 70 risks associated with its dissemination.
- In 2016, the European Central Bank issued an analysis of virtual currency schemes, acknowledging the potential advantages of virtual currencies.
- In 2017
  - The European Securities and Markets Authority (ESMA) published a study in 2017 on the use of distributed ledger technology (DLT) in securities markets.
  - Also in the same year, ESMA released two statements on initial coin offerings (ICOs), one on investor risks and the other on the laws that apply to companies that participate in these offers. After that, the European Commission directed the EBA and ESMA to evaluate the applicability and appropriateness of the existing EU financial services regulatory framework to crypto assets.
- In 2018
  - The European Parliament released two reports about virtual currencies and central banks’ monetary policy.
  - The Financial Stability Board (FSB) released a study on the crypto asset market and its potential pathways for future financial stability concerns.
- In 2019
  - During the G7 meeting of July 2019 risks posed by global stablecoin projects were discussed.
  - FINMA, the Swiss financial authority, published a supplement to its ICO guidelines outlining how it treats so-called ‘stable coins’ under Swiss supervisory law.
  - In 2019, ECB highlighted the paper series with a discussion about stability in crypto-assets.
- In 2020
  - In September 2020, The European Commission has today adopted a new Digital Finance Package, including Digital Finance and Retail Payments Strategies, and legislative proposals on crypto-assets and digital resilience.
  - In 2020, the ECB released a report about stablecoins’ regulatory status.
  - In 2020, the European Commission proposed a pilot regime for market infrastructures that wish to try to trade and settle transactions in financial instruments in crypto-asset form.
- In 2021
  - In July 2021, The European Central Bank is launching a pilot project for the "digital euro". Also, it has officially launched a 2-year-long study on the creation of a Digital Euro and the various nuances that would involve.
  - In July 2021, the European Commission released a statement that would apply what is known as the travel rule to crypto transactions to make them more traceable.
  - In September 2021, European Securities and Markets Authority published a report on Trends, Risks and Vulnerabilities where crypto assets are considered a high-risked innovational financial technology.
- On April 20, 2023, the EU Parliament passed the Markets in Crypto Act (MiCA), a unified legal framework to regulate crypto-assets in the European Union, in order to mitigate money laundering and help reduce consumer risk by making providers liable for losses.
- In 2023, FINMA concluded enforcement proceedings against the Dohrnii Foundation, finding that its DHN token qualified as a security because the planned platform was not operational at the time of its initial coin offering (ICO). The decision was described by critics as creating legal uncertainty for blockchain projects, as ICOs are generally intended to raise capital for the subsequent development of platforms before they become operational.

== Cryptocurrency market ==
According to Chainalysis, Europe's growth was largely driven by so-called "whales", large institutional investors shifting enormous sums of cryptocurrency. (Note: As of June 24, 2023, Tether is the preferred blockchain for Yevgeny Prigozhin and his Wagner Group because Tether still supported the trading of Russian rubles across digital-asset exchanges.) According to Chainalysis, Europe has the world's largest crypto economy, collecting $1 trillion in the previous year, or 25% of all crypto activity worldwide.

Different countries have their own approach to cryptocurrencies legalization, distribution, and storage.

=== Germany ===
Germany continues implementing crypto into the national regulation. First, they started with licensing crypto custody service providers and defining crypto assets as financial instruments. Now private funds are allowed to keep 20% of their investments in crypto.

In August 2020, the Ministry of Finance and the Ministry of Justice of Germany promulgated a bill to regulate electronic securities in the country (eWpG-E).

=== United Kingdom ===
Although the United Kingdom affirmed in 2020 that crypto assets are property, it has no cryptocurrency regulations and does not consider cryptocurrencies to be legal tender. Mining of cryptocurrencies is permitted.

In March 2022, the Financial Conduct Authority (FCA) declared that all cryptocurrency ATMs in the country were illegal and would need to be shut down. None of the ATM's operators had successfully registered with the agency. The FCA cited a failure to comply with know your customer laws (KYC), which track and prevent money laundering, as well as the high risk to customers, due to a lack of regulation and protection. At the time, Coin ATM Radar listed 81 such ATMs in the country.

=== Ukraine ===
In September 2021, the Parliament of Ukraine passed a law to legalize cryptocurrency. The law divided virtual currencies into secured and unsecured assets and establishes an obligation for crypto service providers to comply with anti-money laundering laws.

In June 2025, the Verkhovna Rada registered Draft Bill No. 13356 to let the National Bank of Ukraine hold and trade virtual assets as reserve assets alongside gold and foreign currency. In September 2025, the Rada passed Bill No. 10225-d in first reading, creating a VASP regime and tax rules: profits are taxed at 18% PIT plus a 5% military levy on fiat conversions in the first year, while virtual-to-virtual exchanges and some low-value transactions are exempt. The proposal classifies virtual assets as asset-backed tokens, e-money tokens, or other virtual assets, and requires provider registration, KYC/AML measures, and annual reporting.

=== The Netherlands ===
In July 2020, The Dutch Central Bank (DNB) said the euro system's central bank digital currency (CBDC) should be more programmable than Bitcoin.

=== Estonia ===
Estonia published its AML Bill as early as 2018. According to the Organization for Economic Cooperation and Development (OECD), Estonia's tax policy is one of the most competitive in the world. There is no income tax in this jurisdiction, therefore funds received through ICOs are not subject to it, and Bitcoin and altcoins are not subject to VAT. As of 2021, 55% of all crypto currency service providers in the world are registered in Estonia according to the Estonian Financial Intelligence Unit (FIU) (Estonian: Rahapesu Andmebüroo (RAB)). On 25 March 2024, the United States Treasury imposed sanctions against the Estonia-based Timur Evgenyevich Bukanov (Russian: Тимур Евгеньевич Буканов) associated Bitfingroup OÜ.

=== Spain ===
In Spain, there is no specific virtual currencies' legislation, except for the law approved in July 2021 on preventing and fighting tax evasion.

=== Austria ===
Investors were cautioned by the Financial Market Authority (FMA) that cryptocurrencies are risky and that FMA does not monitor or control virtual currencies, including bitcoin or any cryptocurrency trading platforms.

=== Hungary ===
In 2014, in a press release the central bank of Hungary, Magyar Nemzeti Bank (MNB), stated that Cryptocurrencies are "much riskier" than conventional forms of electronic payment, such credit cards.

=== Denmark ===
The Financial Supervisory Authority of Denmark declared in a statement that it will not regulate the use of bitcoin and that it is not a form of currency.

The Financial Supervisory Authority (FSA) released a statement on 17 December 2013 that supporting the European Banking Authority 's warning. In 2017, FSA notified that it has no regulatory control over bitcoin transactions, hence it does not prevent anyone on the establishment of such business.

In 2013, FSA's chief legal adviser stated that Denmark might consider changing existing financial regulation to include virtual currencies.

=== Sweden ===
The Swedish Tax Agency issued a preliminary decision on Value Added Tax (VAT) on bitcoins, declaring that trading bitcoins is not subject to Swedish VAT, but is instead subject to the Financial Supervisory Authority regulations and treated as a currency.

Financial Supervisory Authority and the central bank in a statement publicly declared that bitcoin is legal but not an official form of payment or legal tender.

=== Czech Republic ===
Czech Republic Govt. stated that businesses and people who purchase, sell, store, manage, or mediate the acquisition or selling of virtual currencies or offer similar services are required to adhere to anti-money laundering regulations.

For the purposes of accounting and taxes, Bitcoin is categorized as an intangible asset rather than as electronic money.

=== Switzerland ===
Swiss Govt declared that Bitcoin businesses in Switzerland are regulated by anti-money laundering laws and may need a banking license in certain situations.

On December 5, 2013, a proposal was submitted by 45 Swiss Parliament members concerning digital sustainability, which urged the Swiss government to evaluate the opportunities for utilization of bitcoin by the country's financial sector.

In response to the parliament's recommendations, the Swiss Federal Council issued a report on virtual currencies in June 2014.

In May 2023, the Swiss Financial Market Supervisory Authority (FINMA) concluded enforcement proceedings against the Dohrnii Foundation, finding that the DHN token qualified as a security because the planned platform was not operational at the time of its Initial Coin Offering (ICO). The decision has been described as the first publicly known case in Switzerland and Europe in which a pre-functional ICO token was classified as a security, despite ICOs generally being used to fund the subsequent development of blockchain platforms. The decision raised questions about the compatibility of FINMA's approach with the traditional ICO model, in which tokens are typically sold before a platform becomes operational to finance its development.

=== Norway ===
In December 2013, the Norwegian Tax Administration said that they did not classify bitcoin as currency but rather as an asset. Wealth tax is applied on profits. In business, use of bitcoin will be subject to tax sale tax.

=== Luxembourg ===
In Luxembourg, the first BitLicense was issued in October 2015.

== See also ==
- Central bank digital currency
