= Aventus (protocol) =

Computer method for ticket purchase

Aventus Protocol
- Original authors: Annika Monari and Alan Vey
- Developer: Aventus Protocol Foundation
- Website: aventus.io

The Aventus is an open standard event ticketing platform based on blockchain. The protocol was first outlined by Annika Monari and Alan Vey in a 2016 white paper. The two met in 2015 while studying for their master's degrees at Imperial College, London. They are co-founders and directors of the Aventus Protocol Foundation which oversees Aventus Systems, the only company running the protocol.

The Aventus Protocol is based on Ethereum blockchain technology and its crypto token is the Aventus Token (AVT). The project was funded in two rounds. First by a private pre-sale and then, in September 2017, in an initial coin offering. The initial funding was reportedly £26 million, including 60,000 Ether raised.

The protocol creates a unique identity for each ticket that is then stored on a public blockchain. Each transaction involving the ticket is likewise recorded publicly. Monari and Vey stated in their white paper that the protocol is a tool to combat counterfeit tickets, uncontrolled resale, and opaque pricing.

The Aventus Protocol was used for some of the tickets sold for the 2018 FIFA World Cup in Russia.
