= Dohrnii Foundation =

Cryptocurrency company

Dohrnii
Denominations
- Code: DHN

Development
- Original author: Dadvan Yousuf
- White paper: dohrnii.io/files/dohrnii-whitepaper-0.pdf
- Initial release: 2021
- Development status: Active
- Developer: Dohrnii Labs

Ledger
- Block explorer: etherscan.io/token/0x32462bA310E447eF34FF0D15BCE8613aa8C4A244
- Circulating supply: 17,075,042 DHN

Valuation
- Exchange rate: Exchange-traded

Website
- Website: dohrnii.io

The Dohrnii Foundation (German: Dohrnii Stiftung) was a Swiss foundation established in Zug, Switzerland, in 2021 by cryptocurrency investor Dadvan Yousuf to develop a blockchain-based financial education platform named after Turritopsis dohrnii, a species of jellyfish known for its ability to revert to an earlier stage of its life cycle. The foundation issued the DHN token to support its planned educational ecosystem, which included a learn-to-earn platform and marketplace.

In March 2025, the price of DHN increased by more than 6,700,000%, rising from approximately $0.007 to an all-time high of about $47 and reaching a fully diluted market capitalization of $15 billion. As of June 2026, DHN was the largest education-focused cryptocurrency token by market capitalization according to CoinMarketCap's Education category.

Following enforcement proceedings by the Swiss Financial Market Supervisory Authority (FINMA) in 2023, the DHN token was classified as a security under Swiss financial market law, in what has been described as the first publicly known case in Europe involving a cryptocurrency token treated as an unregistered security.

== History ==
The Dohrnii Foundation was established in Zug, Switzerland, in 2021 by cryptocurrency investor Dadvan Yousuf to develop a blockchain-based financial education platform centred on the DHN token. The project introduced a learn-to-earn model intended to reward users with cryptocurrency for completing educational content. Development was funded through an initial coin offering (ICO) conducted in 2021, during which the foundation sold DHN tokens to around 500 investors and raised approximately €3 million.

In May 2022, the Swiss Financial Market Supervisory Authority (FINMA) opened enforcement proceedings against the foundation and its founder. In its Press release published in May 2023, FINMA concluded that because the planned platform was not operational at the time of the token sale in 2021, the DHN token functioned as a pre-functional investment token. FINMA therefore classified it as a hybrid token with characteristics of a utility token, asset token and payment token, and concluded that, in those circumstances, it qualified as a security under Swiss financial market law. Yousuf stated that the platform did not become operational because FINMA intervened a few months after the ICO and, through a super-provisional order, prohibited further activities, effectively halting the project's development until the enforcement proceedings concluded. He argued that ICOs are generally conducted before a platform is operational, with the proceeds used to finance its subsequent development. In 2026, the Dohrnii Foundation was identified as the only ICO project whose development was halted following enforcement action by FINMA. The article also noted that similar enforcement actions had been brought against cryptocurrency token issuers in the United States, although many of those proceedings were later discontinued following changes in regulatory policy at the U.S. Securities and Exchange Commission.

In a 2024 interview with blocmates, Yousuf stated that, following the dissolution of the foundation in 2023, the project continued as a decentralized autonomous organization (DAO), while he no longer remained involved in its day-to-day operations.

== Dohrnii Academy ==
The Dohrnii Academy is a financial education platform operated within the Dohrnii ecosystem. The platform offers educational content focused on cryptocurrency and blockchain technology, and incorporates a learn-to-earn model through which users can receive DHN token rewards for completing educational activities.

== DHN token ==
According to "Dohrnii: Whitepaper Zero", the DHN token was intended to support the Dohrnii ecosystem, which the whitepaper describes as a global movement rather than a token created solely to access a financial education platform.

Historical price of the Dohrnii (DHN) token in U.S. dollars.

The token was initially distributed through the foundation's 2021 ICO. Following its launch in 2022, the DHN token was listed on a decentralized cryptocurrency exchange through what Dohrnii described as a "community listing" organized by members of the Dohrnii DAO rather than by the foundation itself. The token initially traded above its ICO issue price before later declining in value. In September 2022, the planned launch of the Dohrnii Academy was postponed, coinciding with a further decline in the market price of the DHN token. In late 2023, a buyback programme was launched allowing participants in the foundation's 2021 ICO to sell their DHN tokens back at the original issue price. Media reports stated that the Dohrnii DAO had accumulated a significant share of the DHN token supply through market purchases and private transactions.

In March 2025, DHN experienced a rapid increase in market price, rising by more than 6,700,000% from below $0.007 to an all-time high above $47. According to market data providers, DHN reached a fully diluted valuation of approximately $15 billion at its peak in 2025. The Swiss financial news website Inside Paradeplatz attributed the price increase to a corporate action involving the DHN token.
