= Brendan Blumer =

American entrepreneur, executive, and investor

- Born: August 8, 1986 (age 40); Cedar Rapids, Iowa, U.S.
- Citizenship: Hong Kong resident
- Known for: EOS.IO; Co-founder of Bullish
- Title: CEO of Block.one

Brendan Blumer (born August 8, 1986) is an American billionaire businessman who has been chief executive officer of Block.one since 2016, which developed the EOS.IO blockchain platform and launched crypto exchange Bullish. He is based in Hong Kong.

== Biography ==
=== Early life ===
Blumer was born and raised in Cedar Rapids, Iowa.

When Blumer was 15, he developed Gamecliff (stylized as GaMeCliff), a website to sell virtual economy assets to be used in multiplayer online gaming. It displayed different characters, weapons, and houses for massively multiplayer online role-playing games including EverQuest and World of Warcraft.

=== Career ===
In 2005, just after graduating high school, Blumer sold Gamecliff to IGE and relocated to Hong Kong to continue to run its operations.

Blumer founded The Accounts Network in 2007, a company that sold in-game MMORPG avatars and reached $1 million in monthly revenues.

In 2010, Blumer and Kokuei Yuan launched Okay.com, an enterprise data sharing platform for real estate brokers in Asia. In October 2013, the company was acquired by Asia Pacific Properties.

His next business project, ii5, also focused on real estate. Founded in 2013, the startup was dedicated to real estate listings in India.

In 2016, Blumer along with Dan Larimer, formed Block.One, a blockchain company, based in part on funding from ii5, his Hong Kong real estate firm.

In May 2017, Blumer announced EOS.IO, a blockchain platform which launched a record setting initial coin offering (ICO), raising over $4 billion.

In February 2018, he was listed by Forbes as one of the "richest people in cryptocurrency".

In 2020, he launched Bullish with Kokuei Yuan; its initial public offering in August 2025 made Blumer a billionaire.

== Personal life ==
In 2020, Blumer renounced his US citizenship. In 2025, he bought a 28-bedroom seafront residence in Sardinia for €160 million.

Blumer married his partner, Salvatore Spano, in San Pantaleo, Sardinia on 5 September 2026.
