= Thomas W. Farley =

American banker

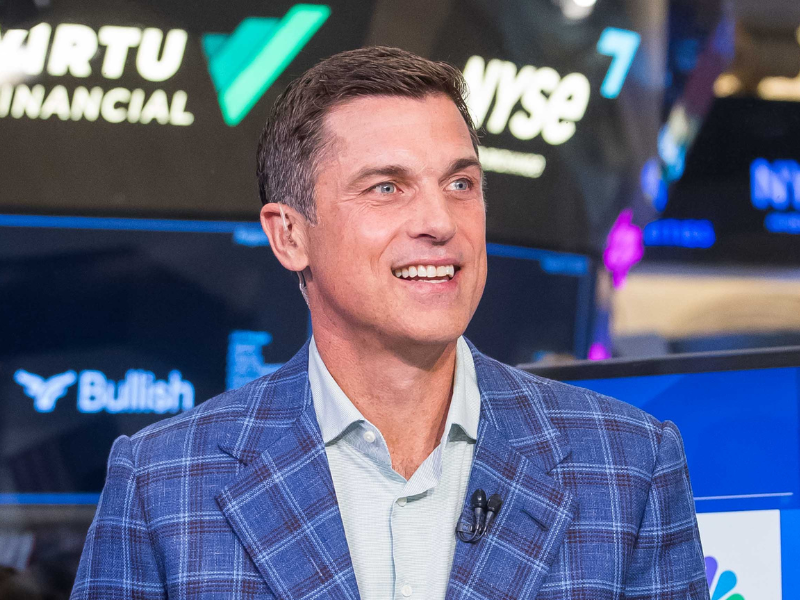
- Farley in 2025
- Born: December 10, 1975; New York City, US
- Education: Georgetown University
- Occupation: CEO of Bullish
- Children: 3

Thomas W. Farley (born December 10, 1975) is an American businessman and the CEO of Bullish. He previously was the president of NYSE Euronext and the New York Stock Exchange. Farley owns approximately 4% of Bullish.

== Early life ==
Farley grew up in Bowie, Maryland. In 1993, he graduated from Gonzaga College High School in Washington, D.C. He graduated from Georgetown University in 1997 with a Bachelor of Arts degree in government, where he played collegiate baseball. He received a Chartered Financial Analyst certification from the CFA Institute.

== Career ==
=== Early career at ICE/NYBOT ===
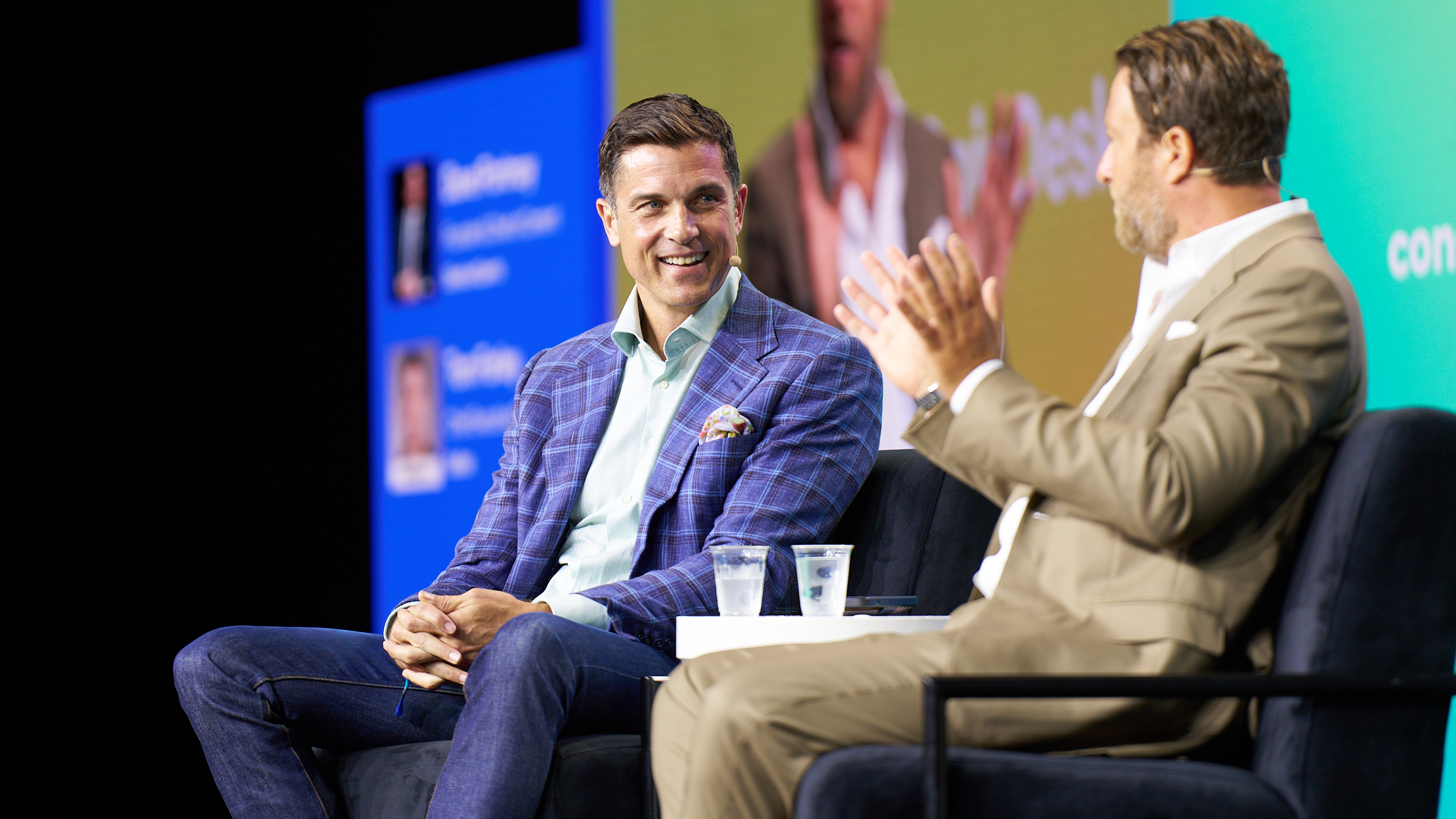
Thomas W. Farley

Farley worked for Montgomery Securities, an investment bank, and Gryphon Investors, a private equity firm. He was the chief financial officer, chief operating officer and later president of SunGard Kiodex, the derivatives advisory subsidiary of SunGard.

In January 2007, at age 30, Farley became the president of the New York Board of Trade at the Intercontinental Exchange (ICE) and chief operating officer of ICE Futures U.S. While he was president of the NYBOT, the company introduced electronic trading, doubled trading volume, and saw earnings rise sixfold. He was later the senior vice president of financial markets at the ICE.

=== New York Stock Exchange (2013–2018) ===
Farley was the chief operating officer of the NYSE Group from November 2013 to May 2014. He was its president from 2014 to 2018. Farley oversaw several major listings, including Alibaba's 2014 initial public offering, which was the largest IPO in U.S. history at the time.

In 2013, on behalf of the NYSE, Farley invested $10 million in Coinbase, which was relatively unknown at the time. As part of the deal, he gained Board-level information rights.

=== Far Point Acquisition Corporation (2018–2020) ===
After a career leading regulated equities exchanges at Intercontinental Exchange and its subsidiary, NYSE, Farley became an advocate of blockchain and decentralized finance.

In 2018, Farley became CEO of Far Point Acquisition, a company he co-founded with Daniel Loeb. The company began trading in June 2018 after raising $550 million in its IPO. Farley was chief executive officer, president and chairman of Far Point Acquisition Corporation.

In 2020, FPAC bought Switzerland-based Global Blue Group Holding AG in a $2.6 billion deal. Global Blue, owned by private equity firms Silver Lake and Partners Group, is an information technology services company that specializes in shopping technology and data-related services. Prior to the Global Blue transaction, Far Point Capital explored approximately 150 potential acquisition targets, with discussions regarding Global Blue beginning in mid-2018.

Global Blue was listed on the New York Stock Exchange in 2020 as "GB." Farley became an Independent Chairman of Global Blue Group Holdings AG and held this position until the business was sold to payments company Shift4 in July 2025.

=== Bullish (2021–present) ===
In 2021, Farley became the chief executive officer of Bullish, a cryptocurrency exchange and blockchain technology company.

Bullish raised $1.1 billion in an initial public offering, and the stock opened at $90 on the New York Stock Exchange under the ticker BLSH.

In 2023, Bullish acquired the crypto news site CoinDesk from Digital Currency Group. Farley also said that Bullish "will immediately inject capital" into the media company to help expand it.

As of March 2025, Bullish held US$144m in stablecoin, US$1.735bn in bitcoin, US$22m in Ethereum, and US$33m in other digital assets.

== Personal life ==
Farley is married to Molly Glynn; they have three daughters. Farley contracted COVID-19 in March 2020.
