= EOS.IO =

Blockchain protocol

EOS
Denominations
- Code: EOS

Development
- Original author(s): Daniel Larimer, Brendan Blumer
- White paper
- Initial release: Dawn 3.0.1-alpha / January 31, 2018; 7 years ago
- Latest release: EOSIO 2.1.0 / May 20, 2021; 4 years ago
- Code repository: eos.io on GitHub
- Development status: Currently under development
- Written in: C++
- Operating system: multi platform
- Developer: Block.one
- License: MIT License (open source)

Ledger
- Timestamping scheme: delegated Proof-of-stake
- Block time: 500 ms
- Block explorer: bloks.io
- Circulating supply: 896,149,492 (27th of July 2018)

Website
- Website: eos.io

Block.one
- Company type: Private
- Industry: Blockchain
- Area served: Global
- Key people: Brendan Blumer (CEO), Daniel Larimer (CTO)
- Products: Decentralized applications
- Website: block.one

EOS.IO is a blockchain protocol based on the cryptocurrency EOS. The smart contract platform claims to eliminate transaction fees and also conduct millions of transactions per second. It was developed by the private company Block.one and launched in 2017. The platform was later released as open-source software.

== History ==
Based on a white paper published in 2017, the EOSIO platform was developed by the private company Block.one and released as open-source software on June 1, 2018. At the launch of the blockchain, one billion tokens were distributed as ERC-20 tokens by Block.one. The CEO of Block.one, Brendan Blumer, announced that the company would support the EOSIO blockchain with over one billion USD in funding from the token sale and ultimately Block.one raised over four billion USD to support the blockchain during the initial coin offering (ICO) period.

The original test net, Dawn 1.0, was released on September 3, 2017, with test net versions Dawn 2.0 released on December 4, 2017, Dawn 3.0 on January 25, 2018, and Dawn 4.0 on May 7, 2018. The name of the cryptocurrency EOS comes from Ancient Greek Ἠώς, "dawn".

EOSIO's Dawn 1.0 was launched on the EOSIO mainnet on June 1, 2018, and is currently operating under version 2.1.0.

In September 2019, Block.one agreed to settle U.S. Securities and Exchange Commission charges related to the $4 billion unregistered ICO for a $24 million penalty. The settlement did not require a restitution offer, registration of tokens, or any disqualifications.

In 2021, EOS was noted as having lower environmental impact than most other cryptocurrencies.

== EOS Network Foundation ==
In August 2021, Yves La Rose founded the organization EOS Network Foundation (ENF). La Rose is an EOS enthusiast who disputes the way Block.one has managed to blockchain and its tokens. The organization has attempted to pressure Block.one into reinvesting its profits into development of the blockchain, and to support new development.

== Block.one, EOSIO ecosystem, and Everipedia ==
Block.one is a company registered in the Cayman Islands, which began offering EOS tokens in June 2017 to the public, raising over $4 billion (a record for an ICO). Daniel Larimer was the Chief Technology Officer of Block.one. Larimer had previously worked on the decentralized exchange Bitshares from 2013 to 2016. After that, he worked on Steemit, a blockchain-based social media platform. On January 10, 2021, Larimer announced his resignation from Block.one.

On December 6, 2017, Everipedia, a for-profit, wiki-based online encyclopedia, announced plans using EOS blockchain technology and work on an airdrop of a cryptocurrency called IQ to encourage generating information. The IQ tokens are intended to be exchangeable for Bitcoin. One of the goals of the company is to stop certain countries from blocking the content, by the integration of the blockchain model. The goal is that once Everipedia is decentralized and hosted on the EOSIO platform, countries such as Turkey and Iran that block Wikipedia will no longer be able to block it, via Everipedia's fork. Mike Novogratz, CEO of Galaxy Investment LP, a cryptocurrency investment firm, and Block.one led a group of institutions that invested $30 million in Everipedia on February 8, 2018. Novogratz also funds EOSIO Ecosystem, a $325-million joint venture between his Galaxy Digital LP and Block.one.
