= Superprovisional measure =

Ex parte interim measures in Swiss civil procedure

A superprovisional measure (German: Superprovisorische Verfügung; French: Mesure superprovisionnelle), also known as an ex parte provisional measure, is a judicial measure under Swiss civil procedure that can be ordered at the request of one party in cases of particular urgency. Its primary purpose is to prevent harm to rights that are the subject of a judicial proceeding.

== Description ==
According to the Swiss Code of Civil Procedure (Article 265):

Superprovisional measures

In cases of particular urgency, especially where there is a risk that enforcement of the measure will be frustrated, the court may order provisional measures immediately, without hearing the opposing party. The court shall simultaneously summon the parties to a hearing to be held without delay or set a deadline for the opposing party to respond in writing. After hearing the opposing party, the court shall rule on the request without delay.

Before ordering provisional measures, the court may, of its own motion, require the applicant to provide security.

Superprovisional measures cannot be appealed; they are reviewed when the judge rules on the provisional measures, often several months later.

Superprovisional measures are ordered without hearing the opposing party; however, the right to be heard must be respected as soon as possible.

== Use and criticism ==
This type of measure is used in various cases. One of the most common is divorce, where the judge can already establish certain constraints such as the marital home, financial contributions, and child custody.

According to Swiss media, provisional and super-provisional measures are often used to implement gag orders and thus “erode press freedom.” In 2022, during the revision of the Code of Civil Procedure, the federal parliament approved a bill proposed by the right wing (UDC and PLR) aimed at relaxing provisional measures. This has been criticized as facilitating media censorship and allowing powerful businessmen to prevent the disclosure of disturbing information.

Reporters Without Borders denounced a proposal as "simply unacceptable", threatening the "special regime necessary to guarantee press freedom". A broad alliance of publishers, unions, and associations warned parliamentarians against this attempt to restrict press freedom.

Among the newspapers that have been subject to superprovisional measures include SonntagsZeitung and Le Matin Dimanche, in the context of an investigation into the failed residency application of Russian oligarch Roman Abramovich in Verbier. L'Agefi was also subjected to superprovisional measures (later lifted) at the request of Flowbank regarding the bank's financial difficulties. The French media outlet Blast had one of its investigations into the Vivara alternative newsletter empire blocked. The economic investigative site Gotham City is also regularly targeted by such measures.

NGOs are also targeted by this legal tool, such as the Bruno Manser Fund, attacked by the daughter of Taib Mahmud, former head of government of the Malaysian state of Sarawak, in the context of an investigation into deforestation, and the NGO Public Eye. In April 2022, a survey conducted by the relief organization EPER among 11 Swiss NGOs highlighted that complaints deemed "abusive" against Swiss NGOs are on the rise.

== Bibliography ==
- Stucki, Blaise; Pahud, Joël (March 2015). Le régime des décisions superprovisionnelles et provisionnelles du code de procédure civile [The regime of superprovisional and provisional decisions under the Code of Civil Procedure] (PDF) (in French). p. 40. Stucki. Archived from the original (pdf) on 2018-11-15.
