= FinanzBuch Verlag =

German publisher

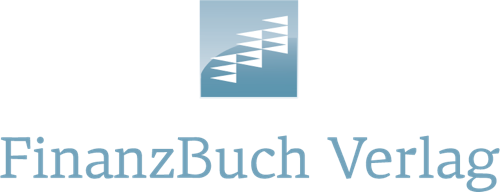
- Genre: Non-Fiction
- Founded: 1997
- Founder: Christian Jund
- Headquarters: Munich, Germany
- Owner: Münchner Verlagsgruppe GmbH
- Parent: Bonnier Group
- Website: www.m-vg.de

FinanzBuch Verlag is a German non-fiction book publisher located in Munich, Germany. It is a brand within the Münchner Verlagsgruppe, which has been a subsidiary of Swedish media conglomerate Bonnier Group since 2017.

== History ==
FinanzBuch Verlag was founded in 1997 by Christian Jund as a financial book publisher. Initially the firm distributed translations of English books, but expanded into original content, collaborating with other media firms such as Financial Times Deutschland.

After the Dot-com bubble collapsed in 2001, the publisher expanded their niche beyond financial books and ventured into politics. Since then the publisher has earned a reputation as a libertarian-friendly publisher. They have published high-profile German-language editions of figures such as Donald Trump and Peter Thiel.

In 2017, the publisher's owner was acquired by the Swedish media conglomerate Bonnier Group.

== Criticism ==
FinanzBuch has published authors covering a number of controversial topics, including "Euro skepticism" and culture war. This has invited criticism the publisher is fostering far-right politics, however others have argued the topics are "economic rather than ethnic concerns.

In 2018, FinanzBuch was widely criticized for publishing controversial economist Thilo Sarrazin, whose best-selling book was cancelled by Random House. The book had been accused of having the potential to "reinforce anti-Muslim sentiments." The publisher said they carefully thought about publishing the book, deciding "[it is a part of a liberal democracy is that all opinions may be represented as long as they do not violate legal regulations."
