= Swiss Financial Market Supervisory Authority =

Government watchdog

- (in German) Eidgenössische Finanzmarktaufsicht (in French) Autorité fédérale de surveillance des marchés financiers (in Italian) Autorità federale di vigilanza sui mercati finanziari (in Romansh) Autoritad federala per la surveglianza dals martgads da finanzas

Agency overview
- Formed: 2007
- Superseding agency: Swiss Federal Banking Commission (EBK-CFB)
- Jurisdiction: Switzerland
- Headquarters: Bern, Switzerland
- Employees: 634 (2024)
- Minister responsible: Karin Keller-Sutter, Federal Councillor
- Agency executives: Stefan Walter, CEO; Marlene Amstad, Chair
- Parent agency: Federal Department of Finance
- Website: www.finma.ch

The Swiss Financial Market Supervisory Authority (FINMA) (Note: German: eidgenössische Finanzmarktaufsicht, French: Autorité fédérale de surveillance des marchés financiers, Italian: Autorità federale di vigilanza sui mercati finanziari) is the Swiss government body responsible for financial regulation. This includes the supervision of banks, insurance companies, stock exchanges and securities dealers, as well as other financial intermediaries in Switzerland.

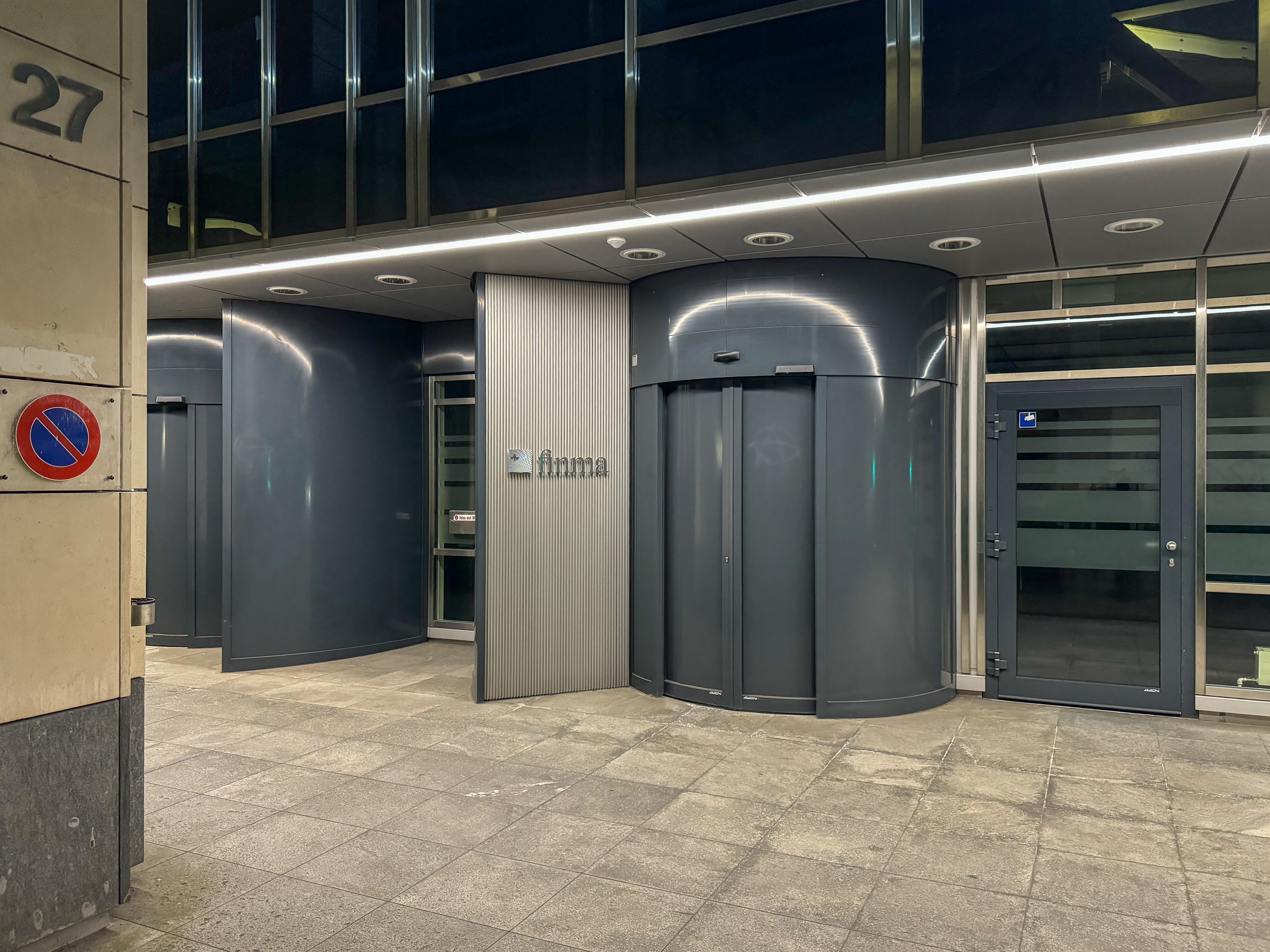
Entrance to the FINMA building.

FINMA was established in 2007 and succeeded the Federal Banking Commission, (Note: German: eidgenössische Bankenkommission; French: Commission Fédérale des Banques) thus EBK-CFB, established in 1934. It is an independent institution with its own legal personality based in Bern. It is institutionally, functionally and financially independent from the central federal administration and the Federal Department of Finance and reports directly to the Swiss parliament.

== History ==
=== Federal Banking Commission ===
Banking supervision was introduced in Switzerland by the Federal Act on Banks and Savings Banks of 1934, following unsuccessful attempts that had started in 1914 and triggered by the severe banking crisis of 1931. The 1934 legislation established the Federal Banking Commission (EBK-CFB) as a national prudential supervisor. For decades, however, the EBK-CFB staff was kept in the single digits on a very small budget. It was still only 10 in 1975, and grew to 35 in the late 1980s.

=== Creation of FINMA ===
FINMA was founded on the 22 June 2007 with the passing of the Federal Act on the Swiss Financial Market Supervisory Authority (FINMASA). This merged the EBK-CFB with the Federal Office of Private Insurance (FOPI) and the Anti Money Laundering Control Authority into one agency responsible for all financial regulation in Switzerland.

Switzerland is home to UBS, one of the world's major banks, and given its significance to the Swiss economy, FINMA has a dedicated regulatory team overseeing its operations.

All Swiss banks must receive a banking license from FINMA. Since 2019, certain fintech companies can also apply for a "FinTech banking license". As of May 2025, four companies hold fintech banking licenses: Bivial AG, Relio AG, SR Saphirstein AG and Yapeal AG.

=== UBS and US tax affair ===
On 19 February 2009, the US government filed suit against UBS to reveal the names of all 52,000 U.S. customers, alleging that the bank and these customers conspired to defraud the US tax authority IRS of legitimately owed tax revenue. However revealing customer names was contrary to Swiss law and put UBS in a difficult position. Eventually UBS, with the support of FINMA, agreed to provide the names of 250 to 300 clients through FINMA and pay U.S. $780 million fines to settle the matter. FINMA used sections 25 and 26 of the Banking Act, provided for situations in which a bank is threatened with bankruptcy, to allow this to happen. Subsequently, in February 2009, the Federal Administrative Court of Switzerland ordered FINMA to stop the transmission to the U.S. tax authorities.

== Responsibilities and functions ==
As a state regulatory body, the FINMA is endowed with supreme authority over banks, insurance companies, stock exchanges, securities dealers and collective investment schemes. It is responsible for combating money laundering and, if necessary, conducts financial restructuring and bankruptcy proceedings. In addition, it has supervisory powers with respect to the disclosure of participations and is the complaints body for decisions of the Takeover Board in the area of public takeover bids for listed companies.

The FINMA grants operating licences for companies and organisations subject to its supervision, monitors the supervised institutions with respect to their compliance with the requisite laws, ordinances, directives and regulations, as well as with the conditions for the granting of licences that must be complied with at all times. If necessary and to the extent permissible by law, the FINMA imposes sanctions, provides administrative assistance and regulates. FINMA is also responsible for ensuring that self-regulation is acknowledged appropriately. The FINMA provides supervision when there is a risk to creditors, investors and policy holders and can penalise individuals or authority, its decision, however, can be challenged in a court. It can also ensure compliance, issue warnings, cancel licenses and liquidate companies. In 2025, FINMA conducted 113 audits of banks, 43 of insurers and 20 in the field of asset management,

=== Supervision ===
FINMA takes a risk-based approach to its supervision of financial institutions, working to identify threats that could affect individual institutions or the entire financial system. FINMA is particularly vigilant about money laundering and the financing of terrorism and closely monitors the Swiss financial markets for AML/CFT compliance.

=== Cryptocurrency regulation ===
In 2023, FINMA concluded enforcement proceedings against the Dohrnii Foundation, finding that its pre-functional DHN token qualified as a security because the associated platform was not operational at the time of its initial coin offering (ICO). The decision has been described as the first publicly known case in Switzerland and Europe in which a pre-functional ICO token was classified as a security. It attracted attention within the Swiss cryptocurrency sector because ICOs are generally conducted to raise capital for the subsequent development of blockchain platforms before they become operational. It also created legal uncertainty for ICOs in Switzerland, as pre-functional utility tokens issued to finance blockchain development were treated as securities under Swiss financial market law until the underlying platform became operational.

== Organisational structure ==
The FINMA is made up of a board of directors, an executive board and an extended executive board.

The Board of Directors is a strategic management body and has seven to nine independent expert members appointed via parliament. It decides on matters of substantial importance, issues ordinances and circulars, and is responsible for FINMA’s budget. It also ensures internal controls by means of an internal audit unit and oversees the Executive Board. The Board of Directors appoints the CEO and elects the members of the Executive Board based on the CEO's proposals.

The Executive Board is FINMA's operational management body and is responsible for ensuring that banks, insurance companies, stock exchanges, securities dealers and other financial intermediaries are supervised in accordance with the law and respective strategy. The Executive Board decides on matters such as the granting of licences, key management, organisational and personnel issues, directives and supervisory matters of cross-divisional significance. The Executive Board prepares the necessary files and materials for decisions on items of business that fall under the remit of the Board of Directors and is responsible for implementing the resolutions of the Board of Directors and its committees.

Anne Héritier Lachat was Chairwoman of the Board of Directors from 2011 until 1 January 2016 when Thomas Bauer, former Ernst & Young partner became Chairman. Since 2021, Marlene Amstad serves as the chair.

In April 2025, FINMA has introduced a chief risk officer role to coordinate risk management across the authority.

== See also ==
- Banking in Switzerland
- Economy of Switzerland
- Securities Commission
- Swiss National Bank
- List of Swiss financial market legislation
- Anti-Money Laundering Act (Switzerland)
- List of financial supervisory authorities by country
