= Initial coin offering =

Cryptocurrency-based funding process

An initial coin offering (ICO) or token sale is a form of capital raising in which a project issues and sells digital tokens using blockchain technology, typically in exchange for cryptocurrency or fiat currency. The tokens may grant access to a product or service, represent participation rights within a network, or function as speculative digital assets traded on cryptocurrency markets.

ICOs emerged in the mid-2010s as a method of financing technology ventures, particularly blockchain-based projects, without relying on traditional intermediaries such as venture capital firms or public equity markets. Depending on their structure and characteristics, tokens offered in ICOs may be treated as securities or fall under other regulatory frameworks, and regulatory treatment varies widely across jurisdictions. Some countries have imposed restrictions or bans on ICO activity, including China, which prohibited domestic token offerings in 2017.

ICOs are typically conducted online and can raise funds globally without the involvement of traditional financial intermediaries.

The rapid expansion of ICO markets between 2016 and 2018 was accompanied by significant investor losses, project failures, and enforcement actions related to fraud and unregistered securities offerings. Regulators and international financial institutions have since emphasised investor protection, disclosure requirements, and the application of existing securities laws to many token offerings.

In 2023, the Swiss Financial Market Supervisory Authority (FINMA) concluded that the Dohrnii Foundation's DHN token qualified as a security because the associated platform was not yet operational at the time of its ICO. The decision has been described as the first and only publicly known case in Switzerland and Europe in which a pre-functional ICO token was classified as a security, despite ICOs generally being conducted to raise capital for the development of blockchain platforms before they become operational. The decision led to discussion about the interpretation of FINMA's ICO guidelines and contributed to legal uncertainty regarding the regulatory classification of pre-functional ICO tokens in Switzerland.

== History ==
Early token sales emerged alongside the development of blockchain-based fundraising mechanisms in the early 2010s. One of the first widely cited offerings was conducted by Mastercoin in 2013, followed by Ethereum's 2014 token sale, which raised approximately 31,000 bitcoin to fund development of its blockchain platform.

Initial coin offerings expanded rapidly in 2016 and 2017 as blockchain-based projects used token sales to raise capital outside traditional venture capital and public equity markets. Academic research and financial reporting documented large increases in capital raised during this period, with billions of dollars invested globally through token sales.

The expansion of ICO activity was accompanied by growing regulatory scrutiny. In July 2017, the U.S. Securities and Exchange Commission issued its Report of Investigation on The DAO, concluding that certain digital tokens offered in ICOs could qualify as securities under existing federal law. Regulators in multiple jurisdictions subsequently issued warnings or restrictions, and China prohibited domestic ICO activity in 2017.

By late 2017 and early 2018, financial authorities and international organisations were issuing coordinated risk warnings regarding investor protection, market integrity, and the application of securities laws to token offerings. Reporting in major financial media documented widespread project failures, fraud allegations, and enforcement actions during and after the peak fundraising period.

Following the 2017 - 2018 boom, ICO fundraising volumes declined substantially amid regulatory enforcement and market contraction. Policymakers and central banks increasingly emphasised the application of existing financial regulation and disclosure requirements to token-based fundraising.

In response to regulatory developments, some market participants began developing alternative token-based financing models designed to operate within established securities frameworks, including security token offerings and other forms of regulated digital asset issuance.

ICO activity declined after 2018 following increased regulatory scrutiny, though similar token sale mechanisms have continued to develop through structured platforms offered by cryptocurrency exchanges.

== Criticisms ==
=== Fraud and regulatory concerns ===
Financial regulators and law enforcement agencies have repeatedly warned that some initial coin offerings (ICOs) have been used to conduct fraud or mislead investors. Authorities in several jurisdictions have stated that the relative lack of disclosure requirements, limited investor protections, and the cross-border nature of token sales can make enforcement difficult and increase the risk of financial loss.

The U.S. Securities and Exchange Commission (SEC) has brought enforcement actions against a number of ICO promoters and has warned that some offerings have involved false or misleading statements, undisclosed compensation arrangements, or unregistered securities sales. Regulators in other regions, including the United Kingdom and the European Union, have similarly warned that many ICOs are highly speculative and that investors may lose the entirety of their investment.

Some governments have taken restrictive measures. In 2017, China banned ICOs and ordered projects to return funds to investors, describing the practice as a form of illegal public financing.

=== Speculative market behaviour ===
The rapid expansion of ICO fundraising during the late 2010s has been widely described by financial commentators as part of a broader period of speculative growth in cryptocurrency markets. During 2017, ICOs raised billions of dollars globally, often for early-stage projects with limited operating history, contributing to sharply rising token valuations and increased retail investor participation.

Following the decline in cryptocurrency prices beginning in 2018, ICO issuance and fundraising fell substantially, and reporting by financial media described a contraction in the market alongside reduced investor demand. Analysts and market observers characterized the cycle as reflecting speculative investment behaviour followed by market correction, a pattern commonly associated with financial bubbles.

== Regulation ==
Following a speculative boom in cryptocurrency prices that peaked in December 2017, regulation of cryptocurrencies has been rapidly changing. The pace of change has been driven in part by incidents of cybertheft, trading halts, and possible market manipulation.

Cryptocurrencies are based on distributed ledger technologies which enable anyone to purchase or transfer their cryptocurrency holdings to any other person without the need for an intermediary (such as an exchange) or to update a central record of ownership. Cryptocurrencies can be transferred easily across national and jurisdictional boundaries. This makes it difficult for central authorities to control and monitor the ownership and movement of holdings of cryptocurrencies.

Countries have different approaches to how they regulate cryptocurrencies. This can depend on the nature of the cryptocurrency itself.

There are two main types of cryptocurrencies from a regulatory perspective: utility tokens and asset-backed tokens. Utility tokens may have value because they enable the holder to exchange the token for a good or service in the future, such as Bitcoin. Asset-backed tokens may have value because there is an underlying asset which the holder of the token can attribute value to. In many countries it is uncertain whether utility tokens require regulation, while it is more likely that asset-backed tokens do require regulation.

This makes it complex for the issuers of cryptocurrencies to analyze which countries their tokens (or coins) can be sold into, and for the prospective purchasers of cryptocurrencies to understand which regulations, if any, should apply.

Jurisdiction	Comments
Australia	ASIC issued guidance in September 2017 stating that the legality of an ICO depends upon its detailed circumstances.
Canada	Working on regulating ICOs.
China	On September 4, 2017, seven Chinese financial regulators officially banned all ICOs within the People's Republic of China, demanding that the proceeds from all past ICOs be refunded to investors or face being "severely punished according to the law". This action by Chinese regulators resulted in large sell-offs for most cryptocurrencies. Prior to the Chinese ban, ICOs had raised nearly $400 million from about 100,000 Chinese investors. A week later, however, a Chinese financial official stated on Chinese national television that the ban on ICOs is only temporary until ICO regulatory policies are in place.
France	As of October 2017, the Autorité des marchés financiers (AMF) was working on regulations governing the use of blockchain technology in capital raising transactions. In September 2018, a new legal regime introduced a visa, delivered by the AMF and obtained on a voluntary basis, which provides some financial guarantees.
Hong Kong	The Securities and Futures Commission released a statement in September 2017 explaining that tokens may constitute securities for purposes of the Securities and Futures Ordinance, in which case dealing in such tokens would be a regulated activity under Hong Kong law.
Isle of Man	Working on regulating ICOs.
Jersey	In December 2017, Arc Fiduciary Ltd, based in Jersey, launched the "Arc Reserve Currency", an asset-backed cryptocurrency based on the Ethereum blockchain., working closely with the Jersey Financial Services Regulator to achieve a workable regulatory solution for the ICO The Arc Reserve Currency does not have a continuing regulatory status, but it is a notable example of how cryptocurrency operators are increasingly working with regulators to improve the investment landscape for holders of cryptocurrencies.
New Zealand	In October 2017, the Financial Markets Authority (FMA) released guidelines on the current regulatory environment in regards to ICOs.
Gibraltar	In October 2017, the government of Gibraltar established a framework for regulating distributed ledger technology (DLT) companies, which came into law on January 1, 2018. It encompasses ICOs and subjects them to financial controls and standards.
South Korea	The Korean Financial Services Commission prohibited ICOs in September 2017 and promised "stern penalties" for violations.
Switzerland	Although Switzerland was previously viewed as a friendly jurisdiction to coin offerings, the Swiss Financial Market Supervisory Authority announced an investigation of an unspecified number of coin offerings in September 2017, and would examine whether these offerings were in compliance with Swiss regulations.
Turkey	Although cryptocurrencies are legal in Turkey, cryptocurrency based business models are not, making initial coin offerings illegal as a result.
United Arab Emirates	The Abu Dhabi Global Market issued official guidance on ICOs in October 2017.
United States	In July 2017 the U.S. Securities and Exchange Commission (SEC) indicated that it could have the authority to apply federal securities law to ICOs. The SEC did not state that all blockchain tokens (ICOs) would necessarily be considered securities, but that determination would be made on a case-by-case basis. In April 2019, the SEC's "FinHub" office issued a guidance featuring over thirty factors that may be used to determine that a digital asset is a security. The SEC charged Maksim Zaslavskiy for fraud in September 2017 in connection with the ICOs for RECoin and DRC World. In November 2018, Zaslavskiy pleaded guilty to charges that carry a term of up to five years imprisonment. The SEC ruled that celebrity ICO endorsements must disclose the amount of any compensation paid for the endorsement. In December 2017, the SEC issued an order stating that the utility-token ICO of Munchee Inc. was classified as a security. In April 2018 the SEC charged two co-founders of Centra Tech, Inc., with running a fraudulent ICO that raised more than $32 million in 2017. The company had drawn endorsements from celebrities including Floyd Mayweather Jr. and DJ Khaled. In September 2019, block.one agreed to settle charges related to its $4 billion unregistered ICO of EOS.IO for a $24 million penalty. The settlement did not require a restitution offer, registration of tokens, or any disqualifications.

== Other links ==
- Token Fundraising After the ICO Boom: Market Evolution and Global Regulation, 2019–2026

== See also ==
- Alternative currency
- Airdrop
- Digital asset
- Private currency
