= The Altruists =

2026 American limited series

- Genre: Biographical drama
- Created by: Graham Moore
- Inspired by: New York magazine articles by: Kevin T. Dugan; Jen Wieczner
- Showrunners: Graham Moore; Jacqueline Hoyt
- Starring: Julia Garner; Anthony Boyle; Alex Lawther; Matt Rife; Madison Hu; Karan Soni; Eugene Young; Naomi Okada
- Composer: Alex Somers
- Country of origin: United States
- Original language: English
- No. of episodes: 8

Production
- Executive producers: Graham Moore; Jacqueline Hoyt; Barack Obama; Michelle Obama; Vinnie Malhotra; Tonia Davis; Jessie Dicovitsky; Lauren Morelli; Scoop Wasserstein; James Ponsoldt; Julia Garner
- Cinematography: Jim Frohna; Craig Wrobleski
- Editors: Jordan Goldman; Maria Gonzales; Franklin Peterson
- Running time: 50−60 minutes
- Production companies: Higher Ground; Scoop Productions; New York Magazine; Vox Media Studios

Original release
- Network: Netflix
- Release: November 19, 2026

The Altruists is a 2026 American television limited series created by Graham Moore about the collapse of cryptocurrency exchange FTX. Julia Garner and Anthony Boyle star as Caroline Ellison and Sam Bankman-Fried respectively. It was released on Netflix on November 19, 2026, and received positive reviews from critics.

== Premise ==
The series centres around Sam Bankman-Fried, founder of FTX and cryptocurrency trading firm Alameda Research, and his business partner and girlfriend Caroline Ellison, co-CEO of Alameda. Both were at the helm when FTX collapsed in November 2022 and it was found that Alameda had used FTX customer funds in violation of the FTX terms of service.

== Cast ==
=== Main ===
- Julia Garner as Caroline Ellison, co-CEO of Alameda Research
- Anthony Boyle as Sam Bankman-Fried, CEO of FTX and co-founder of Alameda Research and FTX
- Alex Lawther as Sam Trabucco, co-CEO of Alameda Research
- Matt Rife as Ryan Salame, CEO of FTX Digital Markets
- Madison Hu as Constance Wang, FTX COO
- Karan Soni as Nishad Singh, FTX head of engineering
- Eugene Young as Gary Wang, FTX CTO
- Naomi Okada as Claire Watanabe

=== Recurring ===
- Hudson Williams as Duncan Rheingans-Yoo
- Jennifer Grey as Sarah Fisher Ellison
- Terry Chen as Changpeng Zhao, CEO of Binance
- Elizabeth Adams as Hannah
- Hannah Galway as Lucy
- Maddie Hasson as Lauren Platt
- Marianna Phung as Lily Zhang
- Paul Reiser as Joe Bankman, Sam's father and a Stanford law professor
- Robin Weigert as Barbara Fried, Sam's mother and a Stanford law professor
- William Mapother as Dr. George Lerner
- Jack Greenlees as Will MacAskill
- Donald Heng as Hot Steve
- David James Lewis as Bill
- Jasmine Lukuku as Valerie

== Episodes ==
No.	Title	Directed by	Written by	Original release date
1	"Inappropriate Relationships"	James Ponsoldt	Graham Moore	November 19, 2026
2	"7 Versions of the Truth"	Kyle Patrick Alvarez	Graham Moore	November 19, 2026
3	"Words With Friends"	Kyle Patrick Alvarez	Brian Chamberlayne	November 19, 2026
4	"Good Guys"	Mairzee Almas	Jacqueline Hoyt	November 19, 2026
5	"Game Nights"	Mairzee Almas	Lauren Morelli	November 19, 2026
6	"The Duck"	Graham Moore	Graham Moore	November 19, 2026
7	"Prisoner's Dilemma"	Silver Tree	Story by : Luvh Rakhe; Teleplay by : Taylor Holt	November 19, 2026
8	"God Mode"	Silver Tree	Jacqueline Hoyt	November 19, 2026

== Production ==
=== Development ===
The eight-part limited series about the collapse of cryptocurrency exchange FTX was created by Graham Moore, who served as co-showrunner with Jacqueline Hoyt. Alongside Hoyt and Moore, executive producers include Barack and Michelle Obama, Vinnie Malhotra and Jessie Dicovitsky for Higher Ground, Scoop Wasserstein for New York Magazine/Vox Media Studios, Lauren Morelli, Tonia Davis, and James Ponsoldt who also directed the first episode. The series was commissioned by Netflix.

=== Casting ===
The cast is led by Julia Garner as Caroline Ellison with Anthony Boyle portraying Sam Bankman-Fried. Garner also serves as an executive producer. Additional cast members such as Alex Lawther, Madison Hu and Matt Rife joined the cast in July 2025. In a September 2025 interview, Hudson Williams revealed that he had joined the cast in an undisclosed role. His role was later confirmed in a March 2026 announcement, along with the casting of Jennifer Grey, Terry Chen, Elizabeth Adams, Hannah Galway, and William Mapother.

=== Filming ===
Principal photography began in Vancouver, British Columbia, in July 2025 and was scheduled to continue into the fourth quarter of 2025. Filming concluded in November 2025.

== Release ==
The limited series premiered on November 19, 2026.

== Reception ==
The review aggregator website Rotten Tomatoes reported a 76% approval rating based on 25 critic reviews, with an average of rated reviews of 7.2/10. Metacritic, which uses a weighted average, assigned a score of 65 out of 100 based on 23 critics, indicating "generally favorable" reviews.
