= Trial of Sam Bankman-Fried =

2023 trial of FTX founder

United States v. Bankman-Fried
- Court: United States District Court for the Southern District of New York
- Full case name: United States of America v. Samuel Bankman-Fried
- Started: October 3, 2023; 3 years ago
- Decided: November 2, 2023; 3 years ago
- Verdict: Guilty on all counts
- Charge: Wire fraud (2 counts); Conspiracy (5 counts)

Court membership
- Judge sitting: Lewis A. Kaplan

United States of America v. Samuel Bankman-Fried was a 2023 federal criminal trial in the United States District Court for the Southern District of New York. Financial entrepreneur Sam Bankman-Fried, commonly known as SBF, was convicted on seven charges of fraud and conspiracy following the collapse of his cryptocurrency exchange FTX in November 2022. After the jury's verdict in November 2023, on March 28, 2024, Bankman-Fried was sentenced to 25 years in federal prison.

The trial and conviction of Bankman-Fried was one of the most notorious cases of white-collar crime in the United States and raised awareness within the business community over criminal activity in the cryptocurrency market. The trial had several implications, with financer Anthony Scaramucci calling Bankman-Fried "the Bernie Madoff of crypto".

The trial received significant media attention, with daily coverage from major news outlets. Prior to his company's collapse, Bankman-Fried was celebrated as "a kind of poster boy for crypto" and FTX had a global reach with more than 130 international affiliates. Some commentators said that the entire cryptocurrency industry was "on trial with him", while others argued this case was about fraud, not cryptocurrencies.

== Background ==
Headquartered in the Bahamas, FTX was, at one time, the third-largest cryptocurrency exchange by volume in the world. One of its customers, Alameda Research, was also co-founded and majority-owned by Bankman-Fried, and the CEOs of the two companies dated on and off until April 2022.

Following a spike in withdrawals and subsequent liquidity crisis, on November 11, 2022, FTX and more than 130 associated legal entities declared bankruptcy. Bankman-Fried resigned as CEO and was replaced by John J. Ray III to manage the bankruptcy proceedings.

On December 12, 2022, prosecutors charged Bankman-Fried on eight counts of fraud and conspiracy, one of which was subsequently dropped. Later that day, he was arrested by the Royal Bahamas Police Force and ten days later, he consented to his extradition to the United States to face trial. He was released on a $250 million bond until August 11, 2023, at which point he was remanded into custody at the Metropolitan Detention Center, Brooklyn, following accusations of witness tampering.

A second trial was scheduled for March 2024, at which Bankman-Fried would have faced a further five charges, including an alleged $40 million bribe to Chinese authorities to unlock $1 billion of Alameda Research's trading funds. (Note: Frozen as part of an investigation into another party.) Prosecutors subsequently decided not to proceed in the interest of the victims, who wanted a quicker resolution to the first trial's sentencing phase. Furthermore, a second trial would not affect how much time Bankman-Fried could face in prison under recommended federal guidelines.

== Charges ==
In the October 2023 trial, Bankman-Fried faced seven charges brought by the U.S. Department of Justice:

- Conspiracy to commit wire fraud on customers
- Wire fraud on customers
- Conspiracy to commit wire fraud on lenders
- Wire fraud on lenders
- Conspiracy to commit commodities fraud
- Conspiracy to commit securities fraud
- Conspiracy to commit money laundering

The indictment claimed that the scheme began in 2019 and involved lying to Alameda Research's lenders, as well as to FTX investors and customers. Bankman-Fried faced to up to 110 years in prison. Bankman-Fried pleaded not guilty to all seven charges. According to Michael Lewis—a financial journalist who met with Bankman-Fried over a hundred times—Bankman-Fried "genuinely thinks he's innocent". Lewis also reported that "some of [the prosecution's witnesses] have said to me, 'I think Sam is innocent.'"

In a private message to Vox writer Kelsey Piper, (Note: Bankman-Fried described Piper as a friend. A spokesperson for Vox said, "several years prior they interacted directly a handful of times through overlapping social and professional networks".) Bankman-Fried explained that "each individual decision seemed fine and I didn't realize how big their sum was until the end" and that his tweets about FTX not investing customer deposits were "factually accurate" since Alameda was the one investing them. When Piper asked, "FTX had just loaned their money to Alameda, who had gambled with their money, and lost it? and you didn't realize it was a big deal because you didn't realize how much money it was?" Bankman-Fried replied, "and also thought Alameda had enough collateral to reasonably cover it".

== Opening statements ==
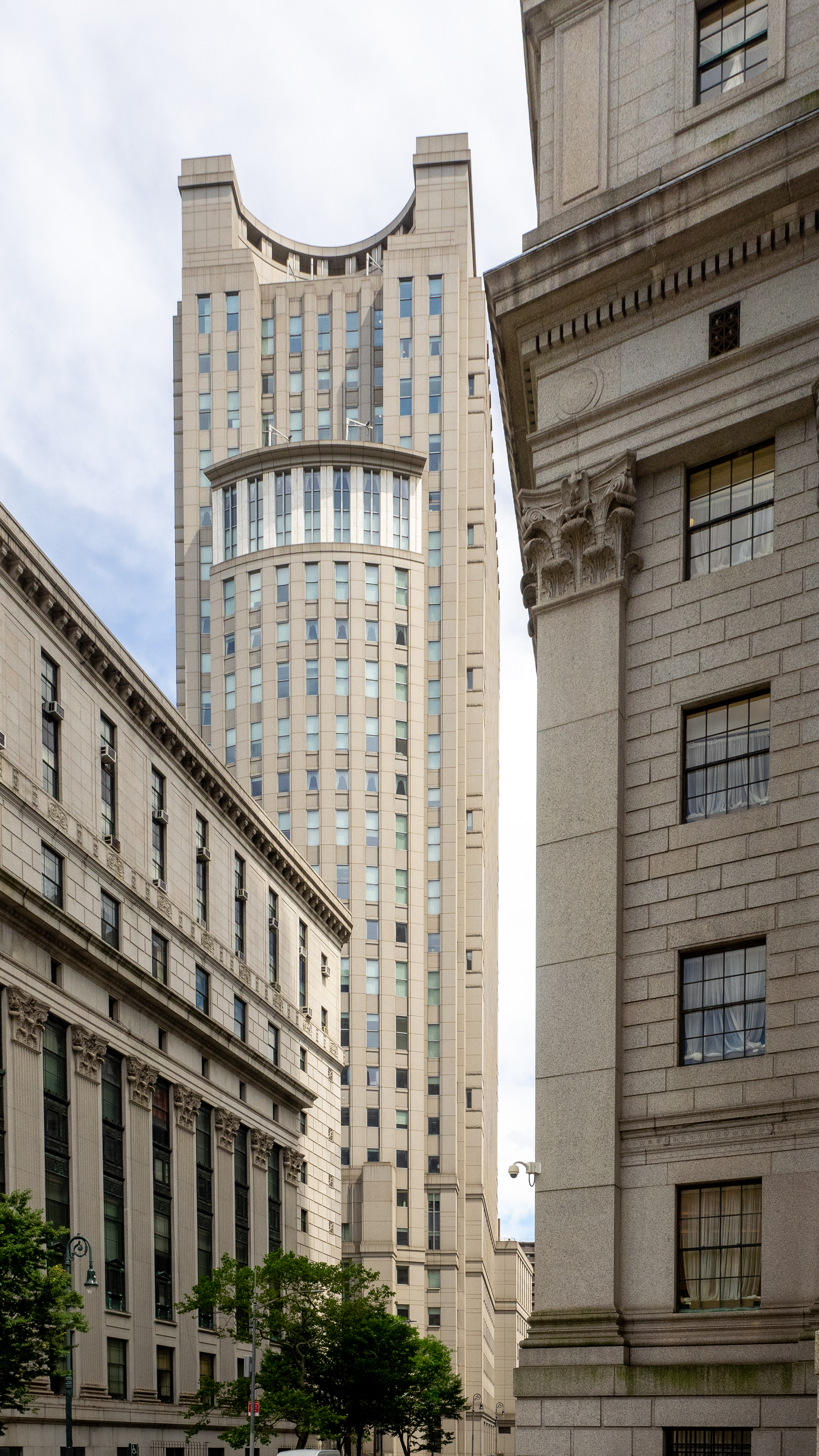
Daniel Patrick Moynihan U.S. Courthouse

The trial began on October 3, 2023, in the Daniel Patrick Moynihan United States Courthouse in Manhattan, New York City, with district judge Lewis Kaplan presiding. The prosecution was led by Assistant U.S. Attorneys Nicolas Roos and Danielle Sassoon. Attorney Mark Cohen led the defense.

The prosecution opened by portraying Bankman-Fried as a villainous, greedy con man. They claimed that he misled investors and said that in loaning FTX customer deposits to Alameda, he "stole billions from thousands of people". To support their accusations, they referenced FTX's terms of service which told customers, "Title to your Digital Assets shall at all times remain with you and shall not transfer to FTX Trading."

The defense presented Bankman-Fried as a "math nerd who didn't drink or party" and who "reasonably believed that there were no laws or provisions in the terms of service that prohibited FTX from loaning out these deposits, whether loans went to Alameda or to other customers". Drawing attention to another part of the terms of service, the defense argued that as a customer engaged in margin trading, Alameda was allowed to borrow money from FTX.

The problems, according to the defense, stemmed from the poor management of Alameda by its CEO, Caroline Ellison. The court was told that Ellison refused Bankman-Fried's advice to scale down her risky trading strategies. The prosecution, however, planned to demonstrate that with respect to Alameda's strategy, Bankman-Fried was "calling the shots".

The overall picture painted by the prosecution was of an accumulation of wealth and power "built on lies", while the defense declared, "It's not a crime to be the CEO of a company that later files for bankruptcy".

== Witnesses for the prosecution ==
=== Caroline Ellison ===
Caroline Ellison is the former CEO of Bankman-Fried's company Alameda Research. In her testimony, she described how Bankman-Fried had "directed" her to "commit crimes" during her time at Alameda, adding that "Alameda took several billion dollars from FTX customers and used it for its own investments" and to pay back its lenders. Ellison, who has pleaded guilty to seven counts of fraud and conspiracy as part of a cooperation deal with prosecutors, told the court that she had sent "dishonest" balance sheets to these lenders to conceal the taking of customer funds. She also testified that she had been concerned about "insiders" taking out a total of around $5 billion in personal loans from Alameda, saying, "Sam directed us to borrow as much money as we could at whatever terms we could".

Initially, Alameda and FTX were run by the same team. Ellison told the court that early on, Bankman-Fried had "set up a system that allowed Alameda to borrow from FTX". Before FTX had its own bank account, Alameda would receive some FTX customer funds into its own bank account, and then some of those funds were spent on expenses, loan repayments, and investments. Alameda also had a $65 billion line of credit on FTX and did not have to post collateral when borrowing, she said. Alameda had been FTX's first and only liquidity provider for a time, but the growth of the exchange attracted others, and eventually Alameda was only around 2% of trades. No other customer had more than a $1 billion line of credit and as far as she knew, Alameda's essentially unlimited credit line was never disclosed to customers, auditors, or investors. Yet FTX would market itself as a "safe" and "audited" exchange. Ellison also testified to Alameda receiving 60–70% of the initial distribution of FTX's native token for free.

In 2021, Ellison and Bankman-Fried discussed a "10th percentile" scenario—they thought there was a 10% chance of a situation at least this bad materializing. According to Ellison's calculations, if they made another $3 billion in venture investments but also converted their loans with Genesis Digital Assets to fixed term, their overall likelihood of finding themselves unable to repay all of their loans was 3%. Bankman-Fried reportedly then asked Ellison to try to change the Genesis loans to fixed term and said that he still wanted to proceed with the investments. Ellison only managed to convert some of the loans.

"For any major decision I would always run them by Sam ... and defer to Sam," claimed Ellison. But she did take responsibility for some major decisions. During the crypto crash in June 2022 when third-party lenders started recalling their loans, Alameda was obligated to repay them immediately but its crypto assets had just lost considerable value. Ellison testified that Bankman-Fried had blamed her "loudly and strongly" for Alameda's precarious financial position and she admitted that she should have hedged its portfolio as he had suggested, although he had been the one "who chose to make all the investments". Additionally, when Bankman-Fried suggested Ellison take on a new co-CEO when her co-CEO left, she rejected the idea and remained Alameda's sole CEO. More generally, she and her co-CEO had taken over a lot of Alameda's day-to-day business in 2020 and by 2021, Ellison testified that Bankman-Fried had largely stopped coming into the Alameda office. She also criticized Binance CEO Changpeng Zhao for his role in the bankruptcy, saying that his "real aim ... was to hurt FTX and Alameda". At one point during her testimony, Ellison broke down in tears, remembering her relief when FTX collapsed because she "didn't have to lie anymore".

During the cross-examination, Ellison admitted to telling prosecutors that Bankman-Fried "might not know" about some of the customer funds in Alameda bank accounts and that there were "periods of time when he wasn't paying attention to Alameda". She also conceded that Alameda had tried to hire several people to oversee their accounting, but they all left.

=== Gary Wang ===
Gary Wang, a long-time friend of Bankman-Fried's and FTX's former chief technology officer, also has a plea deal with the government and is hoping to serve no jail time. On November 7, 2022, when FTX was facing "an $8 billion shortfall in customer assets" and customer withdrawals spiked, Bankman-Fried gave the assurance on Twitter that "FTX is fine. Assets are fine" and that they had "enough to cover all client holdings." This was not accurate, Wang testified, although under cross-examination he admitted to having previously told prosecutors that it was technically true in virtue of FTX still being solvent, just not liquid. When Bankman-Fried made the decision a few days later to hand over some remaining assets to Bahamian regulators, the alleged motivation was that Bahamian authorities were more open to letting him retain control of FTX than U.S. authorities were.

In 2019, Wang had altered FTX's code to allow Alameda to withdraw essentially unlimited funds without being automatically liquidated. While Bankman-Fried never wrote nor reviewed FTX's code himself, Wang testified that he made the change on Bankman-Fried's direction. Wang did, however, concede that this was a necessary part of Alameda providing the exchange with liquidity.

Despite Wang claiming that he didn't know if Ellison had properly hedged, the defense was able to highlight a statement made by Bankman-Fried in a September 2022 memo about potentially shutting down Alameda: "The fact that we didn't hedge as much as we should have alone cost more in EV [expected value] than all the money Alameda had ever made or ever will make, and that's the kind of critical mistake we're likely to make if I'm not actually running the show there."

=== Nishad Singh ===
Former head of engineering Nishad Singh was the third FTX executive to enter a plea bargain with the prosecution and is also hoping to serve no jail time. He testified that he was unaware of Alameda using customer funds until Wang informed him in September 2022 that Alameda was borrowing $13 billion from FTX. Singh had then requested a meeting with Bankman-Fried in which Singh expressed that he was "really freaked out" by Alameda's net asset value (NAV). Bankman-Fried reportedly told Singh that Alameda's NAV was actually "super positive" and that while they were "a little short on deliverables", he thought Alameda could deliver $5 billion quickly and "substantially more" over weeks to months by Alameda selling assets and FTX raising from investors. Singh requested another meeting after Bankman-Fried returned from trying to raise funds in the Middle East. In this meeting, according to Singh, Bankman-Fried still maintained that they could get another $5 billion, but also said that the main way Alameda would be able to return its loans would be through FTX remaining successful.

Singh recounted how Bankman-Fried had "profligately" spent "huge sums of money" on investments, campaign donations, celebrity endorsements, and real estate. Examples shared with the court included $1.5 billion for a bitcoin mining deal with a company in Kazakhstan, (Note: Judge Kaplan asked Singh how he knew that it was Bankman-Fried who made that investment decision; Singh admitted he did not know.) $205 million for the naming rights to the arena of the Miami Heat NBA basketball team, and a $30 million apartment for himself and his colleagues to live in. Singh condemned the spending as "evil" and reported how he had described one investment as "value extractive" to Bankman-Fried. On cross-examination, Singh conceded that he had taken the master bedroom in said $30 million apartment and that he had borrowed $3.7 million from FTX to buy a house after he became aware of the misuse of customer funds. And he acknowledged originally thinking of some of Alameda's privileges on FTX as "helpful for customers".

Singh also testified to back-dating some transactions in December 2021 to bump FTX's revenue over the $1 billion milestone. Then in November 2022, feeling "suicidal" as the crisis intensified, Singh proposed backdating a trade to write off some of his own debt, to which Bankman-Fried replied, "I think that's probably fine". The court were shown a message exchange from around the same time in which Singh said to Bankman-Fried, "this is wildly selfish of me, but [FTX lawyers] may need to know that it wasn't a ton of people orchestrating it. I think it makes them more likely to want to be here to help save the situation and the others at least". Bankman-Fried is seen replying, "yup", followed by, "[for what it's worth] I don't think that's super selfish, I think that's probably correct".

=== Adam Yedidia ===
Under an immunity order, FTX software engineer Adam Yedidia reported learning in June 2022 that Alameda owed FTX $8 billion. In the course of fixing a bug in FTX's code that had overstated Alameda's liability by $8 billion, Yedidia noticed that Alameda's remaining liability to FTX was still $8 billion. He testified that he discussed this with Bankman-Fried, although under cross-examination he admitted that the postmortem report he had circulated to Bankman-Fried and others had not specified the size of the liability. But the amount seemed worryingly large to Yedidia, so one day after a game of paddle tennis he asked Bankman-Fried, "Are we OK?" to which Bankman-Fried allegedly replied, "We were bulletproof last year, but we're not bulletproof anymore." In November, Yedidia "heard that Alameda Research had used FTX customer profits to pay back its loans to creditors" and resigned.

=== Other witnesses ===
Other witnesses for the prosecution included FTX customer Marc-Antoine Julliard, FTX general counsel Can Sun, Alameda software engineer Christian Drappi, BlockFi CEO Zac Prince, angel investor Matt Huang, accounting professor Peter Easton, investigative analyst Shamel Medrano, FBI agent Marc Troiano, Eliora Katz, and Cory Gaddis. (Note: Katz and Gaddis appeared only briefly and were described by Judge Kaplan as a "waste" of time.)

== Witnesses for the defense ==
=== Sam Bankman-Fried ===
There was speculation on whether Bankman-Fried would testify, since his attorneys argued that the restrictions on his prescribed medication for ADHD while in jail ostensibly hindered his ability to "meaningfully participate" in the trial. However, on October 27, he took the stand.

Key themes of Bankman-Fried's testimony were that other executives had a lot of decision-making power and that there was some critical information he was not aware of at the time. Many of Alameda's problems stemmed from Ellison's refusal to follow his hedging advice, according to Bankman-Fried, and Wang and Singh were responsible for FTX giving Alameda a practically unlimited line of credit. In general, Bankman-Fried claimed to have only been vaguely familiar with how funds actually moved between FTX and Alameda until it was too late. He also expressed regret, acknowledging that "a lot of people got hurt" as a result of his mistakes. All he had wanted to do, he said, was "build the best product on the market."

==== Alameda's "back door" line of credit ====
On Bankman-Fried's understanding, the money Alameda borrowed from FTX came from "margin traders" or assets on the exchange that were earning interest. "FTX didn't have restrictions on what people could do with funds they would borrow," Bankman-Fried said. "So long as we believed that the risk was being managed, which is to say, so long as we believed its assets were greater than its liabilities, we didn't care if the user, you know, withdrew funds and used them to buy muffins, to pay business expenses, to invest or anything else."

FTX would automatically liquidate positions that were at risk of going negative. However, the company's rapid growth put strain on the system and eventually a major glitch led to the exchange shutting down for an hour while the error was fixed. Their primary liquidity provider, Alameda, was also nearly liquidated in the process. After this incident, Bankman-Fried told Wang and Singh to create a mechanism—perhaps "an alert or a delay"—to prevent erroneous automatic liquidation. He did not know exactly what they chose to implement. Wang and Singh, after all, "were authorized to make decisions on behalf of the company without consulting with me." But Bankman-Fried was aware of "roughly" how much Alameda's line of credit was using, which he understood to be "millions in 2019" and "around $2 billion" by 2022.

==== The fiat@ account ====
FTX used an "omnibus" customer wallet, meaning that customers' digital assets were transferred to one central wallet for that asset. Many centralized exchanges use omnibus accounts for customer assets, Bankman-Fried told the court, because separate storage would have been "impractical". But net customer assets were kept in separate bank accounts to profit.

Fiat currency was initially received via Alameda and other payment processors. But Bankman-Fried testified that he "wasn't entirely sure what was happening" there. He claimed to have thought that "either the funds were just being held in a bank account" or that they were "being sent to FTX", and that if Alameda was borrowing and using those funds, then surely they would have recorded it on the "info@" account that tracked how much credit Alameda was utilizing.

==== Company policies ====
The defense highlighted a provision in FTX's May 2022 terms of service that let a customer's balance be clawed back to cover others' losses in certain situations, including futures trading, and to a section that warned customers that futures trading was "high risk." Bankman-Fried said that he "skimmed over [the terms of service] a few times" and "went through parts of it in more detail after it was released." He confirmed that he'd been aware that certain data "needed to be preserved for the foreseeable future", including interactions with regulators, official communications and business records.

==== Donations and politics ====
"There were issues I cared about," said Bankman-Fried, "pandemic prevention being the chief one—I had a belief that the most effective way to help prepare the world for future pandemics was through policy". But as well as pandemic prevention and other non-business issues, he spoke to members of Congress about cryptocurrency regulation (he'd started a small, separate, U.S.-based exchange) and admitted that a minority of his political donations were related to FTX's business. He denied telling Singh or Ryan Salame to make political donations and said that he had hired a political consultant because he wanted to donate effectively and in a compliant way. The source of funds for his donations, he said, were "loans from Alameda".

The court heard of Alameda's origins as a trading firm staffed in part by members of the effective altruism movement, which advocates earning as much money as possible in order to give it to charity. However, shortly before Ellison had joined, "There were sharp divides between two groups of the company, and ultimately one of them resigned and took most of the capital with it." Bankman-Fried also recounted how he and Ellison would have "philosophical" debates, often started by her, in which she would generally stake out some "contrarian" position.

==== Lavish spending ====
According to Bankman-Fried, FTX moved to The Bahamas mainly because they wanted somewhere where they could be fully licensed and only a few countries had a full regulatory framework for crypto. He moved into the $30 million apartment when other FTX staff had started to settle in that resort, because he wanted to replicate the living experience they'd had in college. The large apartment also doubled up as an "office away from the office". The general investment in luxurious accommodation, he further explained, was to incentivize engineers from Facebook and Google to move countries and work for FTX instead.

He defended the marketing budget, pointing out that it was only 10–20% of their revenue while their competitors' marketing budgets "appeared to be 100%" of their revenues and that Coinbase was also running Super Bowl ads. He became the face of the company by "accident at first"—he was "somewhat introverted"—but after some initial hesitancy about a big marketing push, he ultimately found it effective overall in putting FTX on the map.

Bankman-Fried highlighted his "significant investment" in Solana—a faster, cheaper blockchain than Ethereum—at "around 20 cents" (Solana was trading around $32 at the time of the testimony). And he "saw no reason" he couldn't personally borrow from Alameda when he needed capital for investments; he was the primary owner and Alameda "had a few billion dollars of arbitrage-based profit," he said. However, Ramnik Arora was apparently the person most involved in FTX's venture deals.

==== May to October 2022 ====
In May 2022, crypto prices plummeted. Bankman-Fried managed to help bail out some of the collapsing companies, but Alameda had also taken a huge hit. Many of its assets were correlated to the crypto market, while many of its liabilities were in dollars. As Bitcoin fell, "Alameda's NAV fell from about $40 billion to around $10 billion ultimately in June 2022."

In June 2022, Ellison told Bankman-Fried that "Alameda may have just gone bankrupt." He was apparently "very surprised" to hear this and "fairly concerned", cancelling a trip to Washington, D.C., he'd had scheduled later that afternoon. A few hours later, Wang, Singh and Yedidia discovered a bug that had caused an $8 billion overstatement of Alameda's liabilities; Ellison now reported Alameda's NAV as $8–10 billion.

Ellison suggested that Alameda "send a balance sheet to lenders who were asking for one" and return loans to third-party lenders who had asked for them. Bankman-Fried agreed to provide "urgent" funding to BlockFi and a small amount of "emergency capital" to Voyager. He remembered Ellison saying she planned to send "something like this", but he did not recall seeing each of the seven balance sheet drafts. "I don't remember the details being discussed," he stated. "I remember looking over it and it seemed reasonable".

In July 2022, Bankman-Fried recounted telling Yedidia that in the wake of the market crashes, Alameda's risk profile was "decent but not bulletproof any more", by which he meant "there was some risk associated with Alameda at that point" and there would be "serious risk down the road if action wasn't taken." Alameda had not hedged against the market crashes despite their "many" conversations about doing so, Bankman-Fried told the court. "I was very concerned that if there were more market crashes after that Alameda might go bankrupt." He spoke to Ellison about hedging again in August and September 2022. When asked how she responded, Bankman-Fried reported, "Um, she started crying. She agreed that Alameda should have hedged."

In September 2022, he considered shutting Alameda down. It was still turning a profit trading, but potential recruits had generally been "going to FTX instead" causing the culture to decline, and management's failure to hedge had cost it 75% of its NAV. More importantly, in Bankman-Fried's view, was the risk Ellison would make similar mistakes again. However, Ellison was purportedly against shutting Alameda down and ultimately Bankman-Fried concluded that Alameda was "still net positive in value".

Wang and Nishad had explained that the June miscalculation was caused by "something called fiat@". The defense displayed a "priority list" prepared by Bankman-Fried for September/October 2022, which included "getting accounting right at FTX" and Bankman-Fried said the project was months of work. The latest liabilities number being discussed as of September was $10 billion. But Bankman-Fried did not yet consider this a "crisis", he said, as even if that figure were correct, he believed Alameda's NAV was also $10 billion, plus he was "more than happy to pledge everything [he] had" as security if necessary. "fiat@", he eventually learned, referred to the fiat deposits Alameda had received on behalf of FTX customers. In October or November 2022, Bankman-Fried finally gained access to the relevant database and—contrary to the prosecution's story—he claimed it was only then that he knew Alameda owed FTX a total of $10 billion. He had previously been under the impression that Alameda's liability to FTX was completely reflected in the info@ account, which showed around $2 billion.

==== November 2022 ====
After Alameda's balance sheet was leaked by CoinDesk, Ellison tweeted that the sheet did not include more than $10 billion of additional assets. Bankman-Fried testified that he believed this to be "true" in virtue of his and Wang's stakes in the Paper Bird entity. But then rival crypto exchange Binance announced that it would be selling its $500 million worth of FTX's native token, triggering a run on FTX. By November 8, Bankman-Fried said he was worrying that FTX "might be days away from a liquidity crisis" and that while Alameda was still solvent, "there was little margin for error left." He took down his "FTX is fine. Assets are fine." tweet from the previous morning and began the long process of liquidating Alameda.

Binance signed a letter of intent to acquire FTX but then backed out. Apollo allegedly considered investing billions of dollars, but when Bankman-Fried told them about the $8 billion in liabilities from the fiat@ account, Apollo wanted to know more about the compliance framework around it; Bankman-Fried consulted FTX general counsel and witness for the prosecution Can Sun before responding. Sun shared his understanding of which assets could and could not be borrowed, which broadly matched Bankman-Fried's understanding.

Mindful of Singh's suicide risk, Bankman-Fried said what he could to reassure his colleague, but ultimately no records were backdated. "I wasn't sure exactly what he intended," he said of Singh's messages, and clarified that his "yup" to Singh was only meant as an agreement that lawyers would probably be more comfortable working with Singh if they believed he bore no responsibility for the current crisis.

==== Cross-examination ====
After acknowledging providing "input" on Alameda's trading decisions, the court heard interview excerpts in which Bankman-Fried claimed he was "walled off" from Alameda's trading and hadn't been "involved" in it for years. The prosecution pressed him on his public portrayal of Alameda compared to other FTX customers, but he only granted that he'd assured people "that Alameda had the same access as other customers" and "that Alameda wasn't front-running other customers", and noted that a firm associated with Three Arrows Capital was also permitted to pledge outside investment as collateral on the exchange. When he was asked if he was not transparent with customers about the risks posed to FTX by Alameda's spending of customer funds prior to November 2022, he said, "It wasn't our policy to disclose customer account details" and that, no, he did not agree with "that phrasing of the question". Private conversations in which Bankman-Fried had said, "fuck regulators" and called people on crypto Twitter "dumb motherfuckers" were also raised, with Bankman-Fried clarifying that he had only been describing a "subset of them".

Regarding Alameda's ability to borrow from FTX without posting collateral, Bankman-Fried claimed, "That was not my understanding." Asked if borrowing from FTX to repay a lender counted as margin trading, he responded, "Potentially yes. I can explain it if you want." He replied with similar ambiguity when asked if he thought there was a hole in customer funds in May 2022, saying, "I always believe there's a risk of a hole". He did, however, admit to signing documents more than a year after their purported effective date and to allowing Bahamian customers to withdraw assets "for a short period" after halting withdrawals for everyone else.

The fiat@ account came up multiple times in the cross-examination. Bankman-Fried claimed to have only learned about FTX customers depositing fiat currency into an Alameda-owned bank account after the process was already underway; he said that he took steps to segregate those funds from Alameda's own funds. He knew that Alameda and other payment processors technically had the ability to spend FTX customers' fiat deposits, but before September 2022, he maintained that he was unaware that Alameda had in fact been spending them. Asked about the fiat@ account, Bankman-Fried reported that staff had told him "that they were busy and that I should stop asking questions because it was distracting". He also testified that Yedidia did "eventually" tell him that Alameda still owed FTX $8 billion.

==== Redirect ====
Approximately 10 million documents and the company database were turned over in discovery. Bankman-Fried confirmed that he had not reviewed every page. He could not remember statements made in his 50 or so interviews in late 2022—a time when, he noted, he did not have access to any internal company documents to aid his memory. He also said that, regarding Ellison's seven balance sheet drafts, he could only recall taking a brief look at one of them. He did remember the "fuck regulators" comment and explained, "I felt like all the work I had done to work with regulators may have wound up encouraging bad regulation instead of good regulation." (Note: This context was also reported at the time.)

Ultimately, Bankman-Fried said that "the liability Alameda had to FTX was about the size of the fiat@ account. That was what myself and most of us had not been aware of in 2022, that roughly $8 billion liability."

=== Other witnesses ===
Krystal Rolle is a Bahamas-based attorney who has previously represented Bankman-Fried on non-criminal matters. She testified that the day after FTX declared bankruptcy, Bahamian authorities ordered Bankman-Fried to transfer remaining assets to the Securities Commission of the Bahamas and that he had cooperated. Joseph Pimbley, an expert in financial risk management, testified that most FTX customers had the kind of account that permitted their funds to be lent to other customers.

=== Rejected testimony ===
Under oath, but without the presence of the jury, Bankman-Fried described how internal lawyers and outside counsel Fenwick & West had been involved in various key decisions at the heart of the case. Judge Kaplan heard that chief regulatory officer Dan Friedberg put together FTX's documentation-retention policy, (Note: Bankman-Fried said that he no longer has access to the policy despite requesting it several times. In earlier planned testimony, he wrote that FTX's new management were unresponsive to communications from himself and from non-U.S. regulators.) that formal business communications would take place via channels without auto-deletion, and that in November 2022, Bankman-Fried disabled auto-deletion "on any place I found it". Bankman-Fried said that he did not consider Ellison's seven drafts of an Alameda balance sheet to be formal business documentation and that business-related spreadsheets were informally shared with lawyers over Signal. Kaplan was shown that it was Dan Friedberg's name on the application form for the bank account that allowed FTX to use Alameda as a payment processor and Bankman-Fried said Friedberg had been part of discussions about using Alameda to receive customer deposits. Bankman-Fried also explained that since some people did not want venture investments to come directly from Alameda, lawyers had suggested he get a loan from FTX and make the investment himself. He further testified that, on the basis of FTX's terms of service, he had believed that Alameda was allowed to borrow funds in "many circumstances"; when pressed on his awareness of Alameda's special privileges as an FTX customer, Bankman-Fried conceded only that he had "believed that it was permissible for there to be borrowing from assets FTX was holding that were acting as security or collateral". Kaplan decided to reject almost all of this testimony.

The first seven witnesses proposed by Bankman-Fried's team were all rejected by Kaplan in September. Among them was English barrister Lawrence Akka, who was to testify that FTX's terms of service "did not contain a declaration of trust over any fiat currency, but gave rise only to a contractual creditor-debtor relationship". Kaplan agreed with the prosecution that since Akka would only be offering "legal opinions as to the meaning of the contract terms at issue", his testimony would not qualify under Rule 702 of the Federal Rules of Evidence, which states that a witness can opine in the courtroom if their expertise can assist in the jury's understanding of matters of fact. Witnesses were also prohibited from testifying about the successful Anthropic investment potentially meaning that FTX customers can be made whole—ostensibly showing Bankman-Fried's investment strategy to be reasonable rather than risky—or Bankman-Fried's charitable donations and philanthropic work.

== Closing arguments ==
The prosecution told the jury that FTX was "a pyramid of deceit built by the defendant on a foundation of lies and false promises, all to get money", and which left "countless victims in its wake" after its collapse. They asserted Bankman-Fried then lied to the jury: "Did you see on Friday how his testimony was smooth like, it'd been rehearsed a bunch of times?" The prosecution argued that the verdict rests mainly on how much Bankman-Fried was aware of where customer funds went and whether he thought it was wrong. The lead prosecutor Nicolas Roos concluded: "He took the money. He knew it was wrong. He did it anyway, because he thought ... he could walk his way out of it and talk his way out of it. And today, with you, that ends."

"Every movie needs a villain" was the retort. Defense lawyer Mark Cohen argued that because the prosecution had no real proof, they had resorted to bullying, talking about Bankman-Fried's sex life and appearance in an effort to get the jury to dislike him. Cohen lamented: "Time and again, the government has sought to turn Sam into some sort of villain, some sort of monster." He continued: "In the real world—unlike the movie world—things can get messy. Poor risk management is not a crime." As for why executives did not take their money and run, and why Bankman-Fried repeatedly "subject[ed] himself to public questioning", the defense claimed that no one thought they were "doing anything wrong". Cohen also noted something missing from the trial: no one actually testified that Bankman-Fried told them to steal money or commit crimes. As the closing arguments came to an end, Bankman-Fried appeared to be crying.

== Verdict ==
The jury began deliberations on November 2 around 3:15 p.m., and ended them after five hours on the same day: Bankman-Fried was found guilty on all charges.

After the verdict, Attorney General Merrick Garland stated: "Sam Bankman-Fried thought that he was above the law. Today's verdict proves he was wrong. This case should send a clear message to anyone who tries to hide their crimes behind a shiny new thing they claim no one else is smart enough to understand: the Justice Department will hold you accountable." Bankman-Fried's defense team stated they would likely appeal, adding that they intended to "vigorously fight the charges."

A new trial of Bankman-Fried was scheduled to begin on March 11, 2024, at the same court with five counts cited, including bank fraud and the bribery of Chinese officials, after the prosecution's request to have some of their charges tried separately was granted in June 2023 by a U.S. judge.

On December 30, 2023, prosecutors announced that they will not conduct a second trial on the five outstanding charges, arguing that "strong public interest" in a prompt resolution of the case, combined with the fact that the evidence that would have been presented at the second trial was already presented at the first trial, as well as the fact that a second trial would not affect how much time Bankman-Fried could spend in prison, meant a second trial was not necessary.

On March 28, 2024, Bankman-Fried was sentenced to 25 years in federal prison. After his trial conviction and sentencing, Bankman-Fried was assigned federal inmate register number 37244-510, and incarcerated in the MDC Brooklyn. A prison transfer process to FCI Mendota reportedly began on May 22, 2024. However, he requested to remain incarcerated in MDC Brooklyn while he pursued an appeal.

== Appeal ==
On April 11, 2024, Bankman-Fried appealed his conviction and the 25-year prison sentence. It is believed the appeals process could take years. The appeal would need to convince the Second Circuit Court of Appeals that Bankman-Fried's legal rights were violated to the extent that his trial was unfair. If that effort fails, Bankman-Fried could then request the United States Supreme Court to hear his case. If his case is accepted by the Supreme Court, Bankman-Fried would then still need to convince that Court that his appeal argument is correct.

On September 13, 2024, Bankman-Fried asked for a new trial arguing that judge Kaplan was biased against him. Bankman-Fried's lawyers said the judge repeatedly mocked their defense counsel and criticized their questioning in front of jurors. He also alleged that the judge also prodded the jurors to reach a quick verdict by offering the jurors meals and rides home to stay late on the first day of deliberations.
