= Bankruptcy of FTX =

2022 cryptocurrency exchange collapse

Logo of FTX

The bankruptcy of FTX, a Bahamas-based cryptocurrency exchange, began in November 2022. The collapse of FTX, caused by a spike in customer withdrawals that exposed an $8 billion hole in FTX's accounts, served as the impetus for its bankruptcy. Prior to its collapse, FTX was the third-largest cryptocurrency exchange by volume and had over one million users.

On 2 November 2022, CoinDesk published an article stating that Alameda Research, a trading firm affiliated with FTX and owned by FTX chief executive Sam Bankman-Fried, held a significant amount of FTX's exchange token, FTT. The article triggered a spike in withdrawals from FTX, but eventually, customers became unable to retrieve the money they had deposited in the exchange. On 11 November, FTX, Alameda Research, and over 100 affiliated entities filed for bankruptcy. Bankman-Fried resigned as FTX CEO and was replaced by John J. Ray III.

The collapse of FTX has had a wide impact on cryptocurrency markets, with comparisons made to the Enron scandal and Madoff investment scandal, and was described by federal prosecutors as "one of the biggest financial frauds in American history". Following the bankruptcy, the Securities Commission of the Bahamas froze the assets of one of FTX's subsidiaries. Bankman-Fried's net worth, estimated at $16 billion prior to the collapse, was reported as having been wiped out, and several institutional investors of FTX wrote off their investment stakes in the company. Some $473 million in funds were later taken from FTX in an "unauthorized transaction". The collapse of FTX resulted in a ripple effect across cryptocurrency markets, with the price of Bitcoin falling to its lowest level in two years.

In late 2022 and early 2023, key executives from FTX and Alameda, such as Caroline Ellison, Gary Wang, and Nishad Singh, pleaded guilty to defrauding FTX customers and related charges. In October 2023, all three testified that it was Bankman-Fried who directed them to commit fraud. On 2 November 2023, Sam Bankman-Fried was convicted of defrauding customers of FTX and lenders of Alameda Research.

== Background ==
Sam Bankman-Fried cofounded Alameda Research, a cryptocurrency trading firm, in 2017. In 2019, Bankman-Fried had the idea of starting a cryptocurrency exchange to help bring in revenue to fund Alameda's activities and founded FTX. Bankman-Fried was the CEO of both companies until he formally stepped down from his position at Alameda in October 2021, promoting traders Caroline Ellison and Sam Trabucco to co-CEOs. Ellison was reported to have a romantic involvement with Bankman-Fried. As of August 2021, Bankman-Fried still owned 90% of Alameda.

The close relationship and potential conflicts of interest between Alameda and FTX drew scrutiny from the rest of the cryptocurrency industry. Alameda was once the largest trader on FTX, bringing liquidity to the exchange. Between 1 June 2022 and 22 July 2022, Alameda's known wallets were the largest stablecoin depositors and sources of liquidity to all of FTX's known wallet addresses, accounting for 10% of Tether transfers and 30% of USD Coin transfers on the exchange. According to John J. Ray III, Alameda had a "secret exemption" from FTX's auto-liquidation protocol.

Alameda Research suffered a series of losses in May and June 2022, which anonymous sources told the Wall Street Journal resulted in FTX lending the trading firm more than half of its customer funds, a decision that the sources said FTX CEO Sam Bankman-Fried described as a "poor judgment call". This was explicitly forbidden by FTX's terms of service. On 12 November 2022, the Wall Street Journal reported that anonymous sources had said that Alameda CEO Caroline Ellison said that she, Bankman-Fried, Gary Wang, and Nishad Singh were aware of that decision. The same was reported in the New York Times on 14 November 2022. FTX used software to conceal the misuse of customer funds.

== Timeline ==
=== CoinDesk article ===
Following months of arguments and disagreements between Changpeng Zhao, the CEO of Binance, and Bankman-Fried, tensions between the two had intensified days before the crisis. Zhao's firm Binance had obtained $2.1 billion in Binance USD and FTT coins in 2021, following a deal in which FTX bought back an equity stake held by Binance in FTX, and in early November 2022, it had 23 million FTT tokens, worth about $529 million at the time. On 2 November, Ian Allison of CoinDesk reported that 40% of Alameda Research's $14.6 billion in assets was FTT token, whether unlocked (their biggest asset), locked or collateral (their third biggest asset).

=== Binance divestment and proposed acquisition ===
FTX Token
Denominations
- Code: FTT

Development
- White paper: "FTT Whitepaper". Archived from the original on 9 November 2022.
- Initial release: 5 May 2019 (7 years ago)

Ledger
- Circulating supply: 134,454,978.27 FTT (est. August 2022)

On 7 November 2022, Zhao announced that Binance had intended to sell its holdings in FTT. Ellison also extended an Alameda offer to Zhao to buy Binance's FTT at $22, which led to speculation that Alameda had loans that would be liquidated if FTT's price fell below that level.

The sale of Binance's holdings in FTT, compounded with the low trading volume of FTT and the enmity between Zhao and Bankman-Fried, resulted in the price of the token plummeting. Binance had received FTT from FTX in 2021 during a transaction in which FTX bought back Binance's equity stake in FTX. Zhao cited "recent revelations that came to light" as the motivation for selling FTT. Bloomberg and TechCrunch reported that any sale by Binance would likely have an outsized impact on FTT's price, given the token's low trading volume. The announcement by Zhao of the pending sale and disputes between Zhao and Bankman-Fried on Twitter led to a decline in the price of FTT and other cryptocurrencies, resulting in $6 billion of customer withdrawals from FTX. FTX became unable to meet the demand for further withdrawals, and on 8 November, Bankman-Fried and Zhao jointly announced Binance had entered into a nonbinding agreement to purchase FTX to ensure that customers could recover their assets in a timely manner. The deal did not include the sale of FTX.US. Zhao announced on Twitter that the company would complete due diligence soon, adding that all crypto exchanges should avoid using tokens as collateral. He also wrote that he expected FTT to be "highly volatile in the coming days as things develop". On the day of that announcement, FTT lost 80 percent of its value.

==== Binance acquisition dropped ====
On 9 November, Bloomberg called the acquisition of FTX by Binance "unlikely" due to the poor state of FTX's finances. Bloomberg also reported that the United States Securities and Exchange Commission and Commodity Futures Trading Commission were investigating the nature of FTX's connections to Bankman-Fried's other holdings and its handling of client funds. Later that day, The Wall Street Journal reported that Binance would not move forward with the deal to acquire FTX. Binance cited FTX's reported mishandling of customer funds and pending investigations of FTX as the reasons for not pursuing the deal. Patrick Hillman, who was at the time Binance's Chief Strategy Officer at the time, said in CNBC interview that they were unable to determine FTX's assets and liabilities. Bankman-Fried said in a Slack message that FTX had learned through the press about Binance's concerns and decision.

==== Collapse and further rescue attempts ====
On 9 November, FTX's website said that it was not processing withdrawals at that time. Bankman-Fried said that although the firm's assets were worth more than its clients' deposits, it would need funds from outside to meet demand for withdrawals due to a lack of liquidity. Bankman-Fried stated on 9 November that FTX.US, as a separate company, was "not currently impacted" by the crisis.

On 10 November, Axios reported that FTX approached Kraken for a potential rescue deal. Bankman-Fried made several statements on 10 November, taking responsibility for FTX's failure and indicating that FTX was attempting to raise $10 billion in emergency financing to remain solvent. Bankman-Fried also announced that Alameda Research would cease trading and end operations. FTX's in-house legal and compliance teams had, for the most part, resigned by 10 November. Anonymous sources cited by the Wall Street Journal on 10 November said that Alameda Research owed FTX some $10 billion, as FTX had lent funds placed on the exchange for trading to Alameda so that Alameda could make investments with the money.

Though Bankman-Fried said that FTX.US customers did not have reason to worry on Twitter on 10 November, employees began attempting to sell assets belonging to the firm on the same day. These assets include stock-clearing company Embed Financial Technologies and the naming rights to FTX Arena. Disagreements emerged between remaining executives, with Bankman-Fried and FTX COO Constance Wang resisting urges from Ryne Miller, a member of FTX US's legal team, to end trading on the exchanges. Bankman-Fried continued to seek funding even as Miller informed other executives that he believed there was a "0%" chance of securing further investment. Miller and other executives asked Bankman-Fried to cede control of FTX US to them, which he resisted. On 11 November, Bankman-Fried announced that he had filed FTX US for bankruptcy along with FTX and Alameda. Bankman-Fried continued to seek capital for FTX after the bankruptcy, and claimed without evidence that a potential backer had emerged soon after the filing.

On 12 November, anonymous sources cited by the Wall Street Journal said Alameda CEO Caroline Ellison disclosed to other Alameda employees that she, Sam Bankman-Fried, Gary Wang, and Nishad Singh knew that client deposits were transferred from FTX to Alameda. An anonymous source cited by the New York Times on 14 November said the same. Anonymous sources cited by the Wall Street Journal said the funds were used in part to pay back loans Alameda had taken to make investments. On 10 November, the Securities Commission of the Bahamas froze the assets of one of FTX's subsidiaries, FTX Digital Markets Ltd, "and related parties", and provisionally appointed an attorney as liquidator. Japan's Financial Services Agency ordered FTX Japan to suspend some operations. The company's Australian subsidiary was placed under administration.

On the same day, a team running the FTX Future Fund, a charitable group bankrolled by Bankman-Fried, announced their collective resignations. Future Fund had committed $160 million in charitable grants and investments by 1 September of that year.

=== Bankruptcy ===
I have over 40 years of legal and restructuring experience. I have been the Chief Restructuring Officer or Chief Executive Officer in several of the largest corporate failures in history. I have supervised situations involving allegations of criminal activity and malfeasance (Enron). I have supervised situations involving novel financial structures (Enron and Residential Capital) and cross-border asset recovery and maximization (Nortel and Overseas Shipholding)…

Never in my career have I seen such a complete failure of corporate controls and such a complete absence of trustworthy financial information as occurred here. From compromised systems integrity and faulty regulatory oversight abroad, to the concentration of control in the hands of a very small group of inexperienced, unsophisticated and potentially compromised individuals, this situation is unprecedented.

— John J. Ray III in the FTX initial bankruptcy declaration

On 11 November, FTX, FTX US, Alameda Research, and more than 100 affiliates filed for bankruptcy in Delaware. Anonymous sources cited by The New York Times said that the exchange owes as much as $8 billion. The crypto lender BlockFi, which was affiliated with FTX, announced on 10 November that it was suspending operations as a result of FTX's collapse. Bankman-Fried resigned as CEO and was replaced by John J. Ray III, a corporate restructuring specialist who previously oversaw the liquidation of Enron. As of 12 November, Bankman-Fried told Reuters that he was still in the Bahamas, though other high-ranking FTX employees had begun leaving for Hong Kong, the location of the company's former headquarters, or other locations. Authorities in the Bahamas, including the Royal Bahamas Police Force, questioned Bankman-Fried on 12 November. Despite FTX's bankruptcy, Bankman-Fried continued to attempt to raise money for the firm during the weekend of 12 and 13 November.

==== Unauthorized transactions ====
Late on 11 November, some $473 million in funds were removed from FTX through what Ryne Miller, FTX US's general counsel, characterized as "unauthorized transactions". Miller further announced that FTX and FTX US intended to move remaining funds denominated in cryptocurrency to offline "cold storage". The funds taken from FTX were mostly stablecoins such as Tether, and were quickly exchanged for Ether, a method used by cryptocurrency thieves to thwart attempts to retrieve stolen funds. A person speaking on behalf of FTX in a Telegram chat referred to the "unauthorized transactions" as a "hack" and encouraged users to delete FTX mobile apps as they were compromised. Kraken has since announced its assistance in identifying the perpetrator. On 14 November, Kraken's chief security officer said on Twitter that the firm knew "the identity" of a user who paid transaction fees associated with moving the stolen money through their Kraken account. In an interview with Kelsey Piper published 16 November by Vox, Bankman-Fried blamed an "ex-employee" or malware on a device owned by an ex-employee for the theft.

In January 2024, the U.S. Department of Justice indicted three individuals for running a SIM swap scam operation that allegedly stole “over $400 million in virtual currency” from an unspecified company between November 11–12, 2022. Sources told Bloomberg that the company was FTX.

Between $1 billion and $2 billion in customer funds reportedly could not be accounted for as of 12 November. The Financial Times reported that FTX's balance sheet shortly before the bankruptcy showed $9 billion in liabilities against $900 million in liquid assets, $5 billion in "less liquid" assets, and $3.2 billion in illiquid private equity investments. American columnist Matt Levine described that among its less liquid assets that "[FTX] relied on to be able to pay out customer balances" were two tokens that "it had just made up", referring to the FTX Token and Serum, a separate cryptocurrency accounted for in the balance sheet.

=== Contagion fears and impact on cryptocurrency markets ===
Cryptocurrencies experienced swings and declines in value as news of FTX's collapse first emerged in early November: Tether dropped below its peg price of $1.00 to $0.97 and Bitcoin sank to its lowest price in two years. Share prices for publicly traded cryptocurrency companies declined. The price of Solana, which was affiliated with Bankman-Fried, declined as well. The crisis at FTX has inspired an increase in withdrawals from other exchanges. A decline in the value of Cronos, the token of exchange Crypto.com, triggered fears of the potential for a collapse similar to that of FTX and spurred withdrawals from the platform. CEO Kris Marszalek provided assurances that the firm was liquid and that it did not use Cronos in a manner similar to the way FTX used FTT. Bloomberg reported that the collapse of FTX exacerbated institutional skepticism of cryptocurrencies as an asset class.

BlockFi, a cryptocurrency lender, filed for Chapter 11 bankruptcy protection on 28 November; the firm had earlier begun preventing withdrawals. The company disclosed "significant exposure" to FTX on 14 November. Another cryptocurrency lender, Genesis, a subsidiary of Digital Currency Group, halted withdrawals on 16 November. This halt caused Gemini, an exchange owned by the Winklevoss twins, to cease allowing redemptions for clients using a service provided through a partnership with Genesis. Another Digital Currency Group subsidiary, Grayscale, saw the value of its flagship offering, the publicly traded Grayscale Bitcoin Trust, decline by 20% over the two weeks preceding 17 November. Grayscale Bitcoin Trust was trading at a discounted price, 42% below the value of its Bitcoin, as of 14 November.

=== Consequent bank failures ===
Silvergate Bank covered colossal losses on the bankruptcy of FTX. On 9 March 2023 Silvergate Bank announced it would wind down its operations and undergo liquidation, in turn creating a domino effect of chain insolvencies. On 12 March 2023, Signature Bank, which catered to operators such as Binance and Celsius Network, collapsed after being closed by the New York State Department of Financial Services after being designated a systemic risk following a run. After Silicon Valley Bank's collapse, Signature Bank's collapse was the third largest in United States history.

=== Solana recovers, FTX to restitute customers with interest ===
In 2023, Solana recovered, making it possible to pay people back. CEO John J. Ray III estimated that "customers and digital asset loan creditors will recover between 118% and 142% of their Petition Date claim values."

Any left over money would normally go to stakeholders (of which SBF is the largest), but the IRS and the SEC also have "somewhat hazy claims", which take priority.

== Investigations ==
Following the collapse of FTX, the Royal Bahamas Police Force launched a criminal investigation into the company.

Anonymous sources cited by Bloomberg said that the office of the United States Attorney for the Southern District of New York had begun an investigation into FTX's collapse as of 14 November.

The United States House Committee on Financial Services plans to conduct hearings in December on the collapse of FTX, and committee leaders said they would seek testimony from Bankman-Fried.

On 15 November 2022, a class-action lawsuit was filed in Miami against Bankman-Fried and several celebrities, including American football quarterback Tom Brady and comedian Larry David, alleging the company engaged in deceptive practices; they are seeking damages. The lawsuit also named Gisele Bündchen, Steph Curry, Shaquille O'Neal, Udonis Haslem, David Ortiz, Trevor Lawrence, Shohei Ohtani, Naomi Osaka, and Kevin O'Leary.

On 12 December 2022, the Royal Bahamas Police Force arrested Bankman-Fried at his Albany penthouse. On 21 December, both Caroline Ellison and Gary Wang (former Chief Technology Officer of FTX) pled guilty to fraud and other charges and signed agreements to "cooperate fully" with federal investigators in their criminal case against Bankman-Fried and "truthfully and completely disclose all information concerning all matters". On 3 January 2023, Bankman-Fried, having been extradited to the United States, pled not guilty to seven charges including wire fraud and conspiracy. His trial began in October 2023 and he was found guilty on all charges on 2 November. He was sentenced to 25 years in prison in March 2024.

== Impact ==
=== Effects on other firms ===
On 16 November 2022, the cryptocurrency brokerage service Genesis suspended withdrawals following FTX declaring bankruptcy, further affecting the industry. The cryptocurrency exchange company Gemini, owned by Cameron and Tyler Winklevoss, announced that it would be pausing withdrawals on its Earn program, which uses Genesis as a lending partner.

The exchange token of Crypto.com, Cronos, lost approximately $1 billion in value in November. On 14 November, Crypto.com's CEO assured users that the exchange was functioning as normal. Commenters and customers remained fearful that Crypto.com could experience a collapse similar to FTX.

==== Losses by FTX investors and customers ====
Institutional investors that stand to lose money due to their stakes in FTX include Tiger Global Management, the Ontario Teachers' Pension Plan, SoftBank Group, BlackRock, Lightspeed Venture Partners, Temasek, and Sequoia Capital. Sequoia Capital wrote down its equity in FTX to $0 on 9 November, losing some $214 million. Sequoia released a notice to investors, also published on Twitter, assuring them the firm's stake in FTX represented a small amount of its overall portfolio, and replaced a profile of Bankman-Fried published on the firm's website with a link to the same notice. The Ontario Teachers' Pension Plan released a similar statement. In addition, Sequoia held a November 2022 conference call where top partners and executives including global leader Roelof Botha defended their due diligence but apologized to investors for backing FTX.

BlockFi, a cryptocurrency lender, was reportedly taking steps to file for bankruptcy as of 15 November, having earlier halted withdrawals. The company disclosed "significant exposure" to FTX on 14 November. Another cryptocurrency lender, Genesis, a subsidiary of Digital Currency Group, halted withdrawals on 16 November. This halt caused Gemini to cease allowing redemptions for clients using a service provided through a partnership with Genesis. BlockFi confirmed speculation by filing for Chapter 11 bankruptcy protection in the United States on 28 November.

Cryptocurrency investment firms with assets still held on FTX after its bankruptcy include Galois Capital and Galaxy Digital. Several public figures also invested in FTX or received compensation for promoting the company. These include former couple Tom Brady and Gisele Bündchen, as well as Shaquille O'Neal, Stephen Curry, and Kevin O'Leary. According to anonymous sources cited by The Information, some venture capital firms are considering lawsuits against Bankman-Fried.

Anthony Scaramucci, founder of SkyBridge Capital, announced the firm was attempting to buy back a 30% stake in the business owned by FTX.

=== Commentary and reactions ===
Jim Chanos predicted the collapse of FTX would lead to increased scrutiny and regulation of cryptocurrencies. Chanos further criticized the cryptocurrency sector as "designed to extract fees from really unsuspecting investors". Richard Handler, CEO of American financial firm Jefferies Group, tweeted on 10 November that he had attempted to meet with Bankman-Fried in July and again in September as he perceived he was "in over his head". Handler stated that Bankman-Fried did not respond to the emails sent from Jefferies staff sent on Handler's behalf. The sudden collapse of FTX has been compared to the bankruptcy of Lehman Brothers by writers in publications including The New York Times and the Financial Times, with some deeming FTX's collapse as "crypto's Lehman moment". Lawrence Summers acknowledged the comparisons to Lehman and further compared the collapse to the Enron scandal, caused by fraud perpetrated by Enron executives. Rostin Behnam, the Chairman of the Commodity Futures Trading Commission, called for Congress to grant the organization more power to regulate cryptocurrencies. Risk management firm Titan Grey published a primer on the commencement and early motions practice of the FTX chapter 11 case, analyzing issues such as creditor privacy, relief from the automatic stay, proposed differential treatment of customers from other creditors, and others.

FTX marketing specialist Nathan Whittemore offered an insider retelling of and reaction to the collapse and bankruptcy on his podcast, The Breakdown, which FTX had also sponsored. In it, he said, "This, I think, is something that will stand with me even when I'm years away from this: it wasn't just, as we will learn shortly, that Sam and a small group around him perpetrated fraud, which they did. From the moment the fraud was called out and the market started to react, every single ounce of their effort went into self-preservation. They continued to ask their team to lie for them publicly, even knowing it could expose those people to legal ramifications. It was callous, cruel and utterly devoid of any genuine human consideration."

Forbes had featured Bankman-Fried on a cover and had included both him and Ellison in their 30 Under 30 before coming under criticism during and after FTX's collapse for promoting a fraud and not taking accountability. Following Bankman-Fried's conviction, the magazine named both Bankman-Fried and Ellison in a Hall of Shame of 30 Under 30 picks that they wish they could take back, alongside the likes of Martin Shkreli and Charlie Javice.

=== In popular culture ===
In July 2023, it was announced that T.J. Miller would star as “a character inspired by Bankman-Fried” in Fortun3, “an interactive series … inspired by the collapse of FTX.” In 2025, a series entitled The Altruists, set to air on Netflix, was announced with Julia Garner cast as Ellison and Anthony Boyle cast as Bankman-Fried.

=== Impact on effective altruism ===
The FTX collapse resulted in scrutiny of and a loss of funding for the effective altruism movement, which Bankman-Fried had funded using profits from FTX. Several leaders of the EA movement, including William MacAskill and Robert Wiblin, have condemned FTX's actions.

Prior to the collapse, Bankman-Fried and other senior leaders of FTX and Alameda were altogether worth approximately $16.5 billion, making them the second-largest group of benefactors to the EA movement after Open Philanthropy and Good Ventures. On 10 November, the team running the FTX Future Fund, a charitable group bankrolled by Bankman-Fried, announced that they had resigned earlier that day. Future Fund had committed $160 million in charitable grants and investments by 1 September of that year.
