= Caroline Ellison =

American business executive and convicted fraudster (born 1994)

- Born: November 1994 (age 31–32); Boston, Massachusetts, U.S.
- Education: Stanford University (BS)
- Known for: former CEO of Alameda Research
- Criminal charges: Wire fraud Money laundering Conspiracy
- Criminal penalty: 24 months prison (served 14); 36 months supervised release; $11 billion asset forfeiture
- Criminal status: released
- Parents: Glenn Ellison (father); Sara Fisher Ellison (mother)

Caroline Ellison (born November 1994) is an American quantitative trader, business executive, and convicted felon. Ellison was co-CEO and later sole CEO of Alameda Research, a trading firm affiliated with now-defunct cryptocurrency exchange FTX.

Following the bankruptcy of FTX and Alameda in November 2022, Ellison pleaded guilty to two counts of wire fraud, two counts of conspiracy to commit wire fraud, conspiracy to commit securities fraud, and conspiracy to commit money laundering. According to The Wall Street Journal, FTX had improperly funneled billions of dollars of its customers' deposits to Alameda to cover sizeable trading losses that Alameda had recently incurred.

Ellison served as a key government witness in the 2023 criminal fraud trial of FTX co-founder Sam Bankman-Fried. U.S. District Judge Lewis A. Kaplan called Ellison's cooperation in the case "very, very substantial" but said prison time was necessary due to the magnitude of the crime. On September 24, 2024, for her role in the scandal, Ellison was sentenced to 24 months in prison and ordered to forfeit $11 billion in assets. She served 14 months in federal custody at FCI Danbury and was released in January 2026.

== Early life and education ==
Ellison was born in Boston to a Catholic family and grew up in nearby suburbs Cambridge and Newton. She is the eldest of three daughters of Glenn Ellison and Sara Fisher Ellison, both economists at MIT. Ellison was brought up Catholic. She says she and her siblings were exposed to economics early, learning Bayesian statistics in primary school. At age 8, Ellison gave her father an economic study of stuffed animal prices from Toys "R" Us for his birthday. At Bigelow Middle School, Ellison and her younger sister Anna competed with the math team coached by their father. In 2008, Ellison received top honors in the American Mathematics Competitions.

As a Newton North High School student, she represented the US in the 2011 International Linguistics Olympiad and received an honorable mention and an award for "best solution". Ellison competed in the Greater Boston Math League through her high school and served as the team's captain. She represented Newton several times in the Math Prize for Girls. During her senior year, Ellison was accepted into the MIT PRIMES after-school program. She graduated in 2012 with a National Merit Scholarship.

Ellison graduated from Stanford University in 2016 with a bachelor's degree in mathematics. While at Stanford, she scored in the top 500 students in the 2013, 2014, and 2015 Putnam Competitions. As a freshman, Ellison developed an interest in effective altruism, a data-based philanthropic movement. She joined Stanford's effective altruism club and served as its vice president.

== Career ==
While attending Stanford, Ellison began her career in quantitative trading with two internships at Jane Street, a proprietary trading firm in New York City. In September 2016, Ellison joined Jane Street full-time as an equities trader in a cohort mentored by Sam Bankman-Fried, who left the firm a year later to serve as director of development at the Centre for Effective Altruism in Berkeley, California.

Ellison and Bankman-Fried bonded over an interest in effective altruism and remained in contact. In February 2018, while visiting the San Francisco Bay Area, Ellison met Bankman-Fried for coffee, and he pitched her on joining Alameda Research, a cryptocurrency hedge fund co-founded in November 2017 by Bankman-Fried and effective altruism colleague Tara Mac Aulay. Ellison joined the following month. She said her "blind leap" was based on excitement over arbitraging cryptocurrencies and the potential to further her pursuit of earning to give. When she joined, Ellison had more experience than most of the other traders. She became co-CEO along with Sam Trabucco in October 2021. She became the sole CEO of Alameda Research in August 2022 after Trabucco stepped down. Despite her position, Ellison received no equity in Alameda Research and only a 0.5% stake in FTX.

In November 2022, Ellison, together with Sam Trabucco, was listed on Forbes 30 Under 30, a pick the publication regretted a year later, placing Ellison on its Hall of Shame, featuring ten picks it wished it could take back. On 6 November 2022, after CoinDesk raised concerns about the balance sheet of Alameda Research and its relationship with FTX, Ellison said that the balance sheet information which had been released only included some of Alameda's assets and that the firm had more than $10 billion of additional assets. According to anonymous sources cited by The Wall Street Journal and The New York Times, Ellison was in a video meeting with employees on 9 November 2022; she admitted there that FTX had used customer money to help Alameda meet its liabilities and that she, Bankman-Fried, and two other FTX executives, Nishad Singh and Gary Wang, were aware of the circumstances. When cryptocurrency company FTX declared Chapter 11 bankruptcy on November 11, 2022, John J. Ray III was appointed to succeed Sam Bankman-Fried as the company's CEO. Ellison was terminated from her position by Ray after FTX, Alameda Research, and more than 100 related companies filed for Chapter 11 bankruptcy.

In August 2026, Ellison joined Manifund, a nonprofit organization that helps charity founders find potential donors. Manifund has acknowledged receiving funding from FTX and Alameda prior to their collapse.

== Fraud conviction ==
In December 2022, Ellison hired Stephanie Avakian of law firm WilmerHale as her lead attorney. On December 18, Ellison pleaded guilty in the Southern District of New York to conspiracy to commit wire fraud on customers of FTX, conspiracy to commit wire fraud on lenders of Alameda Research, wire fraud on lenders of Alameda Research, conspiracy to commit commodities fraud, conspiracy to commit securities fraud, and conspiracy to commit money laundering. On that day, FTX co-founder Gary Wang also pleaded guilty to several charges. A transcript of her plea hearing was unsealed on December 23, revealing she had admitted to judge Ronnie Abrams that she and others conspired to steal billions of dollars from customers of FTX while misleading its investors and lenders. Ellison told Judge Abrams that Sam Bankman-Fried and other FTX executives had received billions of dollars in secret loans from Alameda Research. As a part of her plea deal, she agreed to make restitution of an amount to be decided by the courts.

In October 2023, Ellison testified for the prosecution in the fraud trial of Bankman-Fried. On September 24, 2024, Ellison was sentenced to serve two years in prison and ordered to forfeit $11 billion to the court. Ellison began serving her sentence at a prison in Connecticut in early November 2024. In December 2024, The Washington Post reported that Ellison's sentence had been reduced by several months. She was released into community confinement in October 2025, and became a free woman on January 22, 2026 after serving fourteen months.

== Personal life ==
Unspecified former FTX employees confirmed that a romantic relationship existed between Ellison and Sam Bankman-Fried. Business Insider said that Ellison's alleged relationship with Bankman-Fried was singled out by CoinDesk. Bankman-Fried told Good Morning America his relationship with Ellison was brief. Ellison, Bankman-Fried, and several friends and coworkers were still cohabiting in a penthouse apartment when FTX collapsed.

Ellison, along with FTX senior employees, contributed to the FTX Foundation's Future Fund, which planned to fund philanthropic endeavors, before ceasing operations when its own senior staff resigned. The staff cited inability to honor grants and concerns about the legitimacy of its funding, leaving some beneficiaries concerned as to whether they would have to return grant money.
