= Canada/USA Mathcamp =

Summer program for school students

Canada/USA Mathcamp is a five-week academic summer program for middle and high school students in mathematics.

Mathcamp was founded in 1993 by Dr. George Thomas, who believed that students interested in mathematics frequently lacked the resources and camaraderie to pursue their interest. Mira Bernstein became the director when Thomas left in 2002 to found MathPath, a program for younger students.

Mathcamp is held each year at a college campus in the United States or Canada. Past locations have included the University of Toronto, the University of Washington, Colorado College, Reed College, University of Puget Sound, Colby College, the University of British Columbia, Mount Holyoke College, and the Colorado School of Mines. Mathcamp enrolls about 120 students yearly, 55 returning and 65 new.

The application process for new students includes an entrance exam (the "Qualifying Quiz"), personal essay, but no grade reports or letters of recommendation (although a reference, who may receive a few short answer questions, is still required). The process is intended to ensure that the students who are most passionate about math come to camp. Admission is selective: in 2016, the acceptance rate was 15%.

Mathcamp courses cover various branches of recreational and college-level mathematics. Classes at Mathcamp come in four difficulty levels. The easier classes often include basic proof techniques, number theory, graph theory, and combinatorial game theory, while the more difficult classes cover advanced topics in abstract algebra, topology, theoretical computer science, category theory, and mathematical analysis. There are generally four class periods each day and five classes offered during each period intended for varying student interests and backgrounds. Graduate student mentors teach most of the classes, while undergraduate junior counselors, all of them Mathcamp alumni, do most of the behind-the-scenes work. Mathcamp has had a number of renowned guest speakers, including John Conway, Avi Wigderson, and Serge Lang.

== Culture ==
In 2004, some campers created Foodtongue, a constructed language in which every word is a word that means a food in the English language. One of the cardinal rules of the language is an agreed ban of direct translation. Foodtongue remains popular among campers, and was compiled into an online wiki, updated and referenced by speakers of the language.

== Notable alumni ==
- Scott Aaronson, American theoretical computer scientist
- Jennifer Balakrishnan, mathematician
- Sam Bankman-Fried, founder and former CEO of FTX
- Greg Brockman, co-founder and President of OpenAI
- Tamara Broderick, computer scientist
- Ivan Corwin, mathematician
- Kenny Easwaran, philosopher
- Shotaro Makisumi, mathematician and speedcuber
- Mike Shulman, mathematician
- Sam Trabucco, former co-CEO of Alameda Research and a New York Times crossword puzzle constructor
- Gary Wang, co-founder of FTX

== See also ==
- Ross Mathematics Program
- MathPath
- Mathematical Olympiad Program
- AwesomeMath Program
