= Deborah Kent =

American historian of mathematics

Deborah Anne Kent (born 1978) is an American mathematics educator, textbook author, historian of mathematics, and historian of astronomy, with particular interests in game theory, 19th-century mathematics, and historic observations of eclipses. She works in Scotland as Senior Lecturer in History of Mathematics at the University of St Andrews.

== Education and career ==
Kent is originally from the Pacific Northwest. After graduating magna cum laude from Hillsdale College, she completed her Ph.D. in 2005 at the University of Virginia. Her dissertation, Benjamin Peirce and the Promotion of Research-Level Mathematics in America: 1830–1880, was supervised by Karen Parshall.

She returned to Hillsdale College as an assistant professor, also becoming the first mathematical research fellow at the Massachusetts Historical Society. After earning tenure at Drake University in Iowa, she moved to the University of St Andrews in 2020. She also serves as Librarian of the London Mathematical Society and a member of the council of the British Society for the History of Mathematics.

She has been involved in the summer program Mathpath since 2019, where she presents a two week series of history plenaries and teaches additional classes.

== Book ==
Kent is the coauthor of Game Theory: A Playful Introduction (with Matt DeVos, Student Mathematical Library 80, American Mathematical Society, 2016).

== Recognition ==
Kent was a 2017 recipient of the Paul R. Halmos – Lester R. Ford Award, with David Muraki, for their paper "A Geometric Solution of a Cubic by Omar Khayyam ... in Which Colored Diagrams Are Used Instead of Letters for the Greater Ease of Learners" in The American Mathematical Monthly. She was the 2017 recipient of the Women of Innovation Award in Academic Innovation and Leadership of the Technology Association of Iowa, recognizing both her mathematics writing and her innovative mathematics teaching.

She is a HiMEd Lecturer of the British Society for the History of Mathematics.
