= Gary Wang =

Gary Wang may refer to:

- Gary Wang (American businessman) (born 1992), notable for his former role as an executive at cryptocurrency firm FTX
- Gary Wang (Chinese businessman) (born 1973), founder of the video sharing company Tudou.com and animation studio Light Chaser Animation Studios
