= Digital Commodities Consumer Protection Act =

Proposed U.S. federal law

The Digital Commodities Consumer Protection Act (DCCPA), S. 4760, is a proposed United States federal law to regulate the trading of cryptocurrencies and related digital assets.

== Proposed law ==
It would place the regulation of crypto assets under the authority of the Commodity Futures Trading Commission, which already regulates the trading of financial derivatives in the United States.

The proposed law has bipartisan support. Legislators sponsoring the DCCPA include senators Cory Booker, John Boozman, Debbie Stabenow and John Thune.

The former FTX CEO Sam Bankman-Fried pushed for crypto regulation via the DCCPA by extensively lobbying Congress, which was perceived as being favorable to FTX but harmful to the broader industry, especially its decentralized finance competitors. The collapse of FTX is seen as likely to delay the process of enacting the DCCPA.
