= CoinDesk =

American website about bitcoin and digital currencies

- Company type: Subsidiary
- Headquarters: New York, NY, U.S.
- Area served: Worldwide
- Founder: Shakil Khan
- Editor: Marc Hochstein
- Industry: Digital currency
- Parent: Digital Currency Group (2016–23); Bullish (2023–present)
- Website: coindesk.com
- Registration: Account required to read articles
- Launched: May 2013; 13 years ago

CoinDesk is an American news site specializing in bitcoin and digital currencies. Founded by Shakil Khan, the firm also provides guides to bitcoin for those new to digital currencies.

Seven years after being acquired by Digital Currency Group, it was purchased in November 2023 by Bullish. In December 2024, CoinDesk's editorial independence came into question after its parent company, Bullish, ordered the removal of an article about Tron founder Justin Sun following complaints from Sun's team. Days later, the outlet dismissed its three top editors, prompting staff to raise concerns about its autonomy from its owner.

== History ==
CoinDesk was founded by entrepreneur Shakil Khan and began publishing in May 2013. Khan is also an investor in BitPay, a bitcoin payment processor.

At the start of 2016, CoinDesk was acquired by Digital Currency Group for an estimated US$500,000–600,000. The next year, in 2017, the company acquired blockchain data and research platform Lawnmower. In 2021 the company acquired cryptocurrency data analytics firm TradeBlock.

In December 2017, CoinDesk established CoinDesk Korea in collaboration with the 22nd Century Media Co., subsidiary of Hankyoreh Co., Ltd. to provide blockchain news service in South Korea.

On November 2, 2022, Ian Allison reported for CoinDesk that FTX's partner firm Alameda Research held a significant portion of its assets in FTX's native token FTT. The news led to a bank run and liquidity crisis at FTX, culminating in FTX filing for bankruptcy protection on November 11. In addition, FTX and Alameda co-founder and former CEO Sam Bankman-Fried was convicted of wire fraud and conspiracy on the one-year anniversary of Allison's story being published.

In November 2023, CoinDesk was acquired by Bullish.

== CoinDesk TV ==
CoinDesk TV is an online video channel that produces live news program every day. The channel produces daily and weekly shows including "First Mover", "The Hash", "All About Bitcoin", "Word On The Block" and so on.

== Consensus Event ==
Consensus is CoinDesk's annual crypto summit. It started in 2015. It has been held in New York City from 2017 to 2019, virtually in 2020 and 2021, and in Austin, Texas since 2022.

== Bitcoin Price Index ==
The CoinDesk Bitcoin Price Index (CoinDesk BPI) was launched in September 2013. The Bitcoin Price Index is an average of bitcoin prices across bitcoin exchanges, and began by using price data from Bitstamp, BTC-e and CampBX. Although Mt. Gox data was not used initially, due to withdrawal concerns for US customers, in November 2013, Mt. Gox was added to the BPI due to "a reduction in the risk premium and the option of additional deposit/withdrawal methods". The Mt. Gox bitcoin exchange was eventually removed from the index in February 2014 after its "persistent failure to meet the index's standards for inclusion".

The index was restored to an average of three exchanges in March 2014 with the inclusion of Bitfinex price data, according to CoinDesk: "Since the decline of Mt. Gox, we have observed that Bitfinex has been able to sustain a dramatic increase in its share of the total volume of U.S. dollar-denominated bitcoins traded".

Publications which have referenced the Bitcoin Price Index data or price include the BBC, The Wall Street Journal, Reuters, The New York Times, CNBC, and Bloomberg News.

== State of Bitcoin report ==
In February 2014, CoinDesk released its first 'State of Bitcoin' report. The aim of the report is: to provide an overview of key cryptocurrency trends, challenges, and opportunities, while also highlighting the most important developments over the last year. A follow-up report in Q2 2014 highlighted that venture capital investment in bitcoin companies was up 28 percent compared to the previous quarter, and that VC investment was pouring into European Bitcoin startups.
