= Glen Van Brummelen =

Canadian historian of mathematics

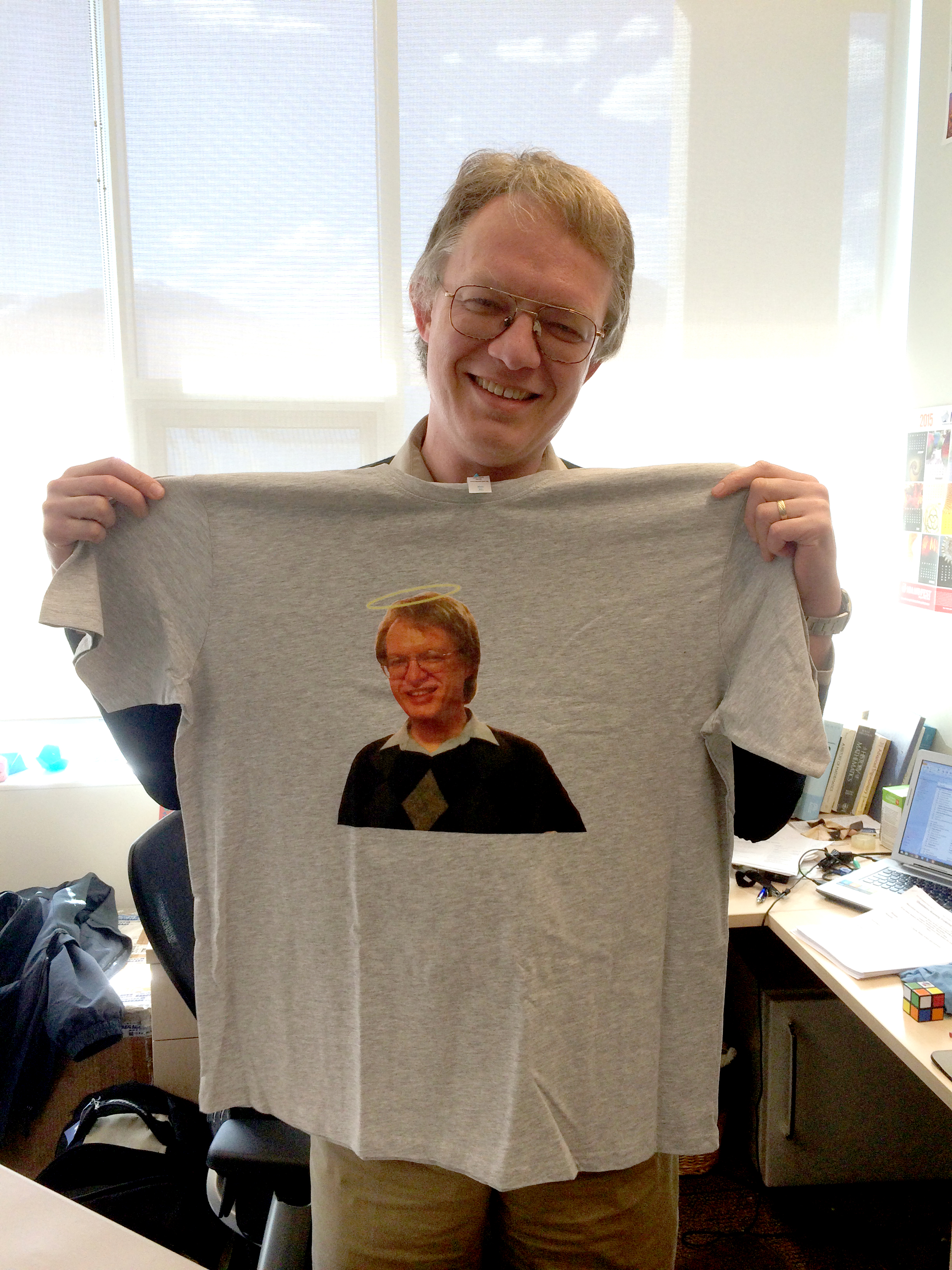
- Van Brummelen holding a t-shirt of Van Brummelen.

Glen Robert Van Brummelen (born May 20, 1965) is a Canadian historian of mathematics specializing in the history of trigonometry and historical applications of mathematics to astronomy.

He is president of the Canadian Society for History and Philosophy of Mathematics, and was a co-editor of Mathematics and the Historian's Craft: The Kenneth O. May Lectures (Springer, 2005).

He has been involved in the summer program Mathpath since 2004 and is the creator of "Glensheep" and their evolution.

== Life ==
Van Brummelen earned his PhD degree from Simon Fraser University in 1993, and served as a professor of mathematics at Bennington College from 1999 to 2006. He then transferred to Quest University Canada as a founding faculty member. In 2020, he became the dean of the Faculty of Natural and Applied Sciences at Trinity Western University in Langley, BC.

Glen Van Brummelen has published the first major history in English of the origins and early development of trigonometry, The Mathematics of the Heavens and the Earth: The Early History of Trigonometry. His second book, Heavenly Mathematics: The Forgotten Art of Spherical Trigonometry, concerns spherical trigonometry.

In 2016 he received a Deborah and Franklin Haimo Award for Distinguished College or University Teaching of Mathematics.

As of 2026 he is on sabbatical as an Erskine Fellow at the University of Canterbury in Christchurch, New Zealand. He was previously awarded the Erskine Fellowship in 2010, 2017 and 2019.

== Works ==
- The Mathematics of the Heavens and the Earth: The Early History of Trigonometry Princeton; Oxford: Princeton University Press, 2009. ISBN 9780691129730, OCLC 750691811
- Heavenly Mathematics: The Forgotten Art of Spherical Trigonometry Princeton; Oxford: Princeton University Press, 2013. ISBN 9780691175997, OCLC 988234342
- Trigonometry: A Very Short Introduction; Oxford: Princeton University Press, 2020 ISBN 9780198814313, OCLC 1101269106
- The Doctrine of Triangles: The History of Modern Trigonometry Princeton; Oxford: Princeton University Press, 2021 ISBN 978-0691179414, OCLC 1201300540
