= BlockFi =

Defunct digital asset lender

- Industry: Cryptocurrency
- Founded: 2017; 9 years ago
- Founders: Flori Marquez; Zac Prince
- Fate: Filed for Chapter 11 bankruptcy protection in November 2022
- Headquarters: Jersey City, New Jersey, U.S.
- Website: blockfi.com

BlockFi was a digital asset lender founded by Zac Prince and Flori Marquez in 2017. It was based in Jersey City, New Jersey. It was once valued at $3 billion.

In July 2022, it was announced that the cryptocurrency exchange FTX made a deal with an option to buy BlockFi for up to $240 million. The deal included a $400 million credit facility for the company.

In November 2022, after the declaration of bankruptcy by FTX, the company halted withdrawals on its platform. The firm disclosed "significant exposure" to FTX on November 14. The next day, the Wall Street Journal reported that BlockFi would likely file for bankruptcy, which was reaffirmed by reports compiled by Bloomberg News. On November 28, BlockFi confirmed the reports and officially filed for Chapter 11 bankruptcy protection with more than 100,000 creditors, according to filings. In March 2023, following the collapse of Silicon Valley Bank, the U.S. Trustee watchdog overseeing BlockFi's bankruptcy revealed that BlockFi had around $227 million in uninsured funds at the bank. BlockFi's CEO Zac Prince testified in the trial of Sam Bankman-Fried, and stated that he thought BlockFi would not have gone bankrupt if it had not lost access to its funds in the FTX collapse. In October 2023, BlockFi emerged from Chapter 11 bankruptcy and announced that it would begin winding down all of its remaining operations and assets post-bankruptcy. Over the next few months, crypto assets will be returned to customers at BlockFi until all assets are fully liquidated. BlockFi will continue to pursue payments from the bankruptcies of FTX and Three Arrows Capital during the liquidation process. In March 2024, BlockFi reached an $874.5 million settlement with the estates of FTX and Alameda Research, and in July 2024 it sold its FTX claims to a third party at a premium to their face value; according to its plan administrator, the sale would allow a final distribution of 100% of eligible customer and general unsecured creditor claims. BlockFi shut down its web platform in May 2024 and began distributing customers' crypto assets through Coinbase, while cash claims were processed by Kroll.
