= Glenn Ellison =

American economist

Glenn David Ellison
- Born: 1965 (age 60–61)
- Spouse: Sara Fisher Ellison
- Children: 3, including Caroline

Academic background
- Education: Harvard University (BA); Churchill College, Cambridge (MPhil); Massachusetts Institute of Technology (PhD)
- Thesis: Strategic interactions in large populations (1992)
- Doctoral advisor: Drew Fudenberg

Academic work
- Institutions: Massachusetts Institute of Technology; Harvard University; CRA International
- Doctoral students: Harrison Hong

Glenn David Ellison (born 1965) is an American economist who is the Gregory K. Palm Professor of Economics at the Massachusetts Institute of Technology (MIT) and an Elected Fellow of the Society for the Advancement of Economic Theory and American Academy of Arts & Sciences. He is the father of convicted business executive Caroline Ellison.

== Education and career ==
Ellison received an A.B. degree in mathematics from Harvard College. He later attended Cambridge University on a Churchill Scholarship and earned a M.Phil. degree in economics in 1988. He then worked briefly as an Associate at Charles River Associates between 1988 and 1989. He received his Ph.D. in economics from MIT in 1992 under the supervision of Drew Fudenberg. After his doctorate, he became an assistant professor of economics at Harvard University from 1992 to 1994. He moved to MIT in 1994 and served as head of the Department of Economics from 2016 to 2017 and again since 2020.

Ellison's research interests include game theory, industrial organization, education, finance, economic geography, and academia.

== Honors and awards ==
Ellison is a Fellow of the American Academy of Arts and Sciences, the Econometric Society, and the Society for the Advancement of Economic Theory, and has received several awards, including an Alfred P. Sloan Research Fellowship and a fellowship from the Center for Advanced Studies in the Behavioral Sciences. He has served on the National Science Foundation Economics Panel and as a council member for the Econometric Society.

== Personal life ==
Ellison married Sara Fisher Ellison, a senior lecturer in economics at MIT. They have three daughters, Caroline, Anna, and Kate. Caroline is known for her work as the CEO of Alameda Research, a defunct cryptocurrency trading firm tied to the collapse of FTX, for which she pleaded guilty to financial crimes and sentenced to two years in federal prison.

Ellison spends time as a math coach for schoolchildren and wrote textbooks for the purpose.
