= Ryan Salame =

American business executive

- Education: (B.B.A) University of Massachusetts Amherst (MS) Georgetown University
- Employer: FTX
- Status: Incarcerated at FCI Cumberland, a medium-security federal prison in Maryland
- Conviction: Conspiracy to make unlawful political contributions Conspiracy to operate an unlicensed money transmitting business
- Penalty: 7.5 years (90 months) in prison

Ryan Salame (born 1993) is an American entrepreneur who plead guilty to conspiracy to make unlawful political contributions and conspiracy to operate an unlicensed money transmitting business. He was the CEO of FTX Digital Markets, the FTX subsidiary based in the Bahamas. He was the founder of the American Dream Federal Action super PAC.

== Early life and education ==
Salame grew up in Sandisfield, Massachusetts. He attended high school at Monument Mountain Regional High School in Great Barrington. He earned Bachelor of Business Administration in accounting from Isenberg School of Management and also Bachelor of Arts in economics from the University of Massachusetts Amherst in 2015. He later received a master's in finance from McDonough School of Business at Georgetown University in 2019.

== Career ==
Salame worked briefly for Ernst & Young. In 2019, he started working for Alameda Research in Hong Kong. He later became co-chief of FTX Digital Markets, FTX's Bahamas unit.

During the primaries of the 2022 United States elections, Salame donated millions of dollars to Republican candidates.

Salame invested over $6 million in Lenox, Massachusetts restaurants and real estate.

During the 2022 bankruptcy proceedings of FTX, it was revealed that the company loaned Salame $55 million. Salame’s girlfriend Michelle Bond received $400,000 in consulting fees from FTX Digital Markets. Salame claimed to have learned about the impending collapse of FTX in the week before it filed for bankruptcy and to have vomited upon hearing the news. In April 2023 the FBI raided Salame’s Potomac, Maryland home.

In September 2023, he pleaded guilty to violating campaign finance laws and operating an illegal money-transmitting business. He agreed to forfeit two properties in Lenox, MA and a Porsche automobile, and pay a $6 million fine and more than $5 million in restitution to FTX. Despite prosecutors recommending a term of 5–7 years, in May 2024 Salame was sentenced to 7.5 years in federal prison.

As of October 2024, he is incarcerated at FCI Cumberland in Maryland. Before his incarceration, Salame gave an interview on Tucker Carlson's YouTube channel, claiming innocence. Carlson supported him.

== In popular culture ==
Salame is portrayed by American comedian and actor Matt Rife in Netflix's The Altruists, a limited series dramatizing the FTX scandal that was released in November 2026.
