= Sam Bankman-Fried =

American cryptocurrency entrepreneur and fraudster (born 1992)

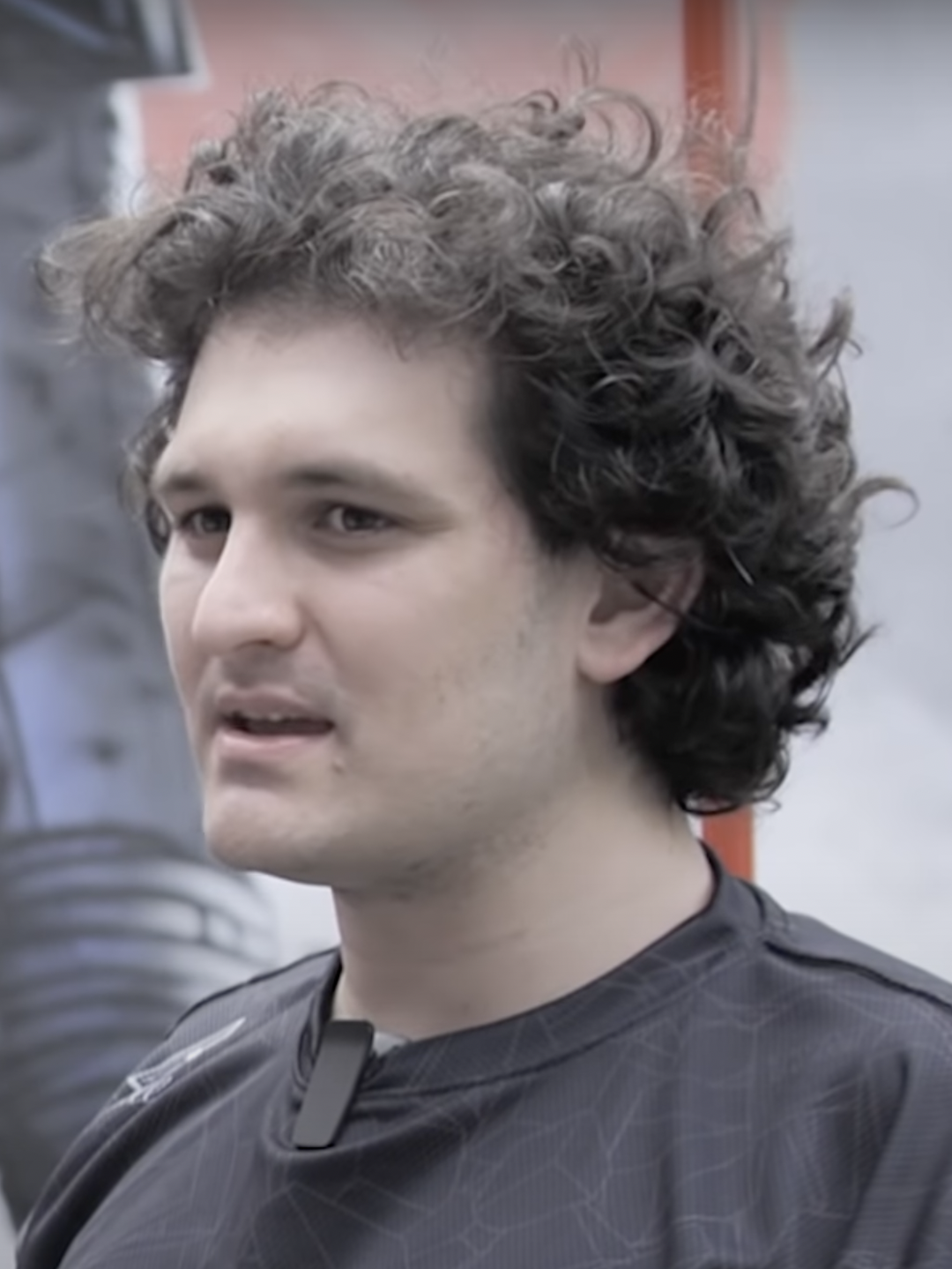
- Bankman-Fried in 2021
- Born: Samuel Benjamin Bankman-Fried; March 5, 1992 (age 34); Stanford, California, U.S.
- Other name: SBF
- Education: Massachusetts Institute of Technology (BS)
- Occupation: Entrepreneur
- Known for: Co-founder and CEO of defunct FTX; Co-founder of defunct Alameda Research
- Parents: Joseph Bankman (father); Barbara Fried (mother)
- Relatives: Linda P. Fried (aunt)
- Convictions: Wire fraud (2 counts); Conspiracy (5 counts); Conspiracy to commit wire fraud (2 counts); Conspiracy to commit securities fraud; Conspiracy to commit commodities fraud; Conspiracy to commit money laundering
- Penalty: 25 years in prison

Details
- Date apprehended: December 12, 2022 (3 years ago)
- Imprisoned at: Federal Correctional Institution, Lompoc I

Samuel Benjamin Bankman-Fried (born March 5, 1992), commonly known as SBF, is an American entrepreneur convicted of fraud. Bankman-Fried founded the FTX cryptocurrency exchange and was celebrated as a "poster boy" for crypto, with FTX having a global reach with more than 130 international affiliates. At the peak of his net worth, he was ranked the 41st-richest American in the Forbes 400.

In November 2022, as evidence of potential fraud began to surface, depositors quickly withdrew their assets from FTX, forcing the company into bankruptcy. On December 12, 2022, Bankman-Fried was arrested in the Bahamas and extradited to the United States, where he was indicted on seven criminal charges, including wire fraud, commodities fraud, securities fraud, money laundering, and campaign finance law violations.

In the case of United States v. Bankman-Fried, he was convicted of all seven counts of fraud, conspiracy, and money laundering. On March 28, 2024, he was sentenced to 25 years in prison and ordered to forfeit $11 billion. The trial was one of the most notorious cases of white-collar crime in the United States; the financier Anthony Scaramucci termed Bankman-Fried "the Bernie Madoff of crypto."

== Early life ==
Samuel Benjamin Bankman-Fried was born on March 5, 1992, to upper-class Jewish parents in Stanford, California. His parents are Barbara Fried and Joseph Bankman, both professors at Stanford Law School. His maternal grandmother, Adrienne Fried Block, was a noted musicologist. His maternal grandfather, George Fried, was an administrator with the New York State Supreme Court probation department.

His aunt Linda P. Fried was the dean of Columbia University Mailman School of Public Health.

Sam's younger brother, Gabriel (b. 1995), had been a legislative assistant and a Wall Street trader. He became director of the nonprofit Guarding Against Pandemics and its associated political action committee. The PAC had come under scrutiny by federal investigators after the discovery that much of the US$35 million on its books had been stolen by Sam from Alameda Research customer accounts.

Both of his parents were sued by the new owners of FTX, to return assets Sam had given the couple in the form of cash and a home valued at over $32 million. His parents admitted Sam gave them the assets as gifts but denied wrongdoing and the case was eventually dropped.

=== Education ===
Bankman-Fried attended Canada/USA Mathcamp, a summer program for mathematically talented high-school students. He attended high school at the elite private Crystal Springs Uplands School in Hillsborough, California.

He graduated from the Massachusetts Institute of Technology in 2014 with a bachelor's degree in physics and a minor in mathematics. As an MIT student, he lived in a coeducational group house called Epsilon Theta.

== Career ==
In the summer of 2013, Bankman-Fried worked as an intern at Jane Street Capital, a proprietary trading firm, trading international ETFs. He returned there to work full-time after graduating from MIT. In September 2017, Bankman-Fried left Jane Street and moved to Berkeley, California, where he worked briefly at the Centre for Effective Altruism (CEA) as director of development from October to November 2017.

In November 2017, following fund injections from billionaire computer programmer Jaan Tallinn and investor Luke Ding, Bankman-Fried and CEA's Tara Hedley (née Mac Aulay) cofounded the quantitative trading firm Alameda Research. By 2021, Bankman-Fried owned approximately 90 percent of Alameda Research. In January 2018, Bankman-Fried organized an arbitrage trade, moving up to $25 million per day to take advantage of the higher price of bitcoin in Japan compared to the United States. After attending a cryptocurrency conference in Macau in late 2018, he moved to Hong Kong.

=== FTX ===
Bankman-Fried founded the FTX cryptocurrency derivatives exchange in April 2019; it opened for business the following month. In September 2021, Bankman-Fried and the entire senior staff of FTX moved from Hong Kong to the Bahamas. Bankman-Fried was included on the 2021 list of Forbes 30 Under 30 but was later included on Forbes 2023 Hall of Shame list, featuring ten picks the publication wishes it could take back.

On December 8, 2021, Bankman-Fried, along with other industry executives, testified before the U.S. House Committee on Financial Services about regulating the cryptocurrency industry. On May 12, 2022, it was disclosed that Emergent Fidelity Technologies Ltd., which was majority owned by Bankman-Fried, had bought 7.6 percent of Robinhood Markets stock. In a November 2022 affidavit before the Eastern Caribbean Supreme Court, and prior to his arrest, Bankman-Fried said he and FTX cofounder Gary Wang together borrowed over $546 million from Alameda Research in order to finance Emergent Fidelity Technologies' purchase of Robinhood Markets stock.

In September 2022, it was reported that Bankman-Fried's advisors had offered on his behalf to help fund Elon Musk's purchase of Twitter. According to messages released as part of the lawsuit between Twitter and Musk during the latter's acquisition of Twitter, on April 25, 2022, investment banker Michael Grimes wrote that Bankman-Fried would be willing to commit up to $5 billion. No investment actually took place when Musk finalized the acquisition. Bankman-Fried invested $500 million in Anthropic and more than $500 million in venture capital firms, including $200 million in Sequoia Capital, itself an investor in FTX. Sequoia published a "glowing" profile of Bankman-Fried, which it subsequently removed after the solvency crisis at FTX. In July 2023, allegations emerged that Bankman-Fried had considered "purchasing" the island country of Nauru to use as a bunker in the event of an apocalyptic event, in what has been described as a "misguided and sometimes dystopian" project.

=== Views on charity and market regulation ===
Bankman-Fried has publicly stated he supports effective altruism, contending that he was pursuing "earning to give" as an "altruistic career". He claimed to make donations "not based on personal interest but on the projects that are proven by data to be the most effective at helping people", such as those that reduced existential risks like nuclear war, pandemics, artificial intelligence, and threats to American democracy.

He was a member of Giving What We Can and donated around half of his Jane Street salary to charity. In June 2022, he signed the Giving Pledge; his name was removed from the list's website in December 2022 following his arrest. Bankman-Fried is the founder of Future Fund, whose team included Scottish philosopher and author William MacAskill, one of the founders of the effective altruism movement. After the collapse of FTX, all members of Future Fund simultaneously resigned. As of September 1, 2022, Future Fund stated it had committed around $160 million to 110 nonprofits. (Note: In the meantime, Bankman-Fried reportedly had spent approximately $135 million on naming rights for the Miami Heat's basketball arena and an estimated $30 million on a single Super Bowl ad.)

The stated reason for FTX's relocation to the Bahamas was the friendly regulatory environment, and Bankman-Fried openly discussed paying off the country's $9 billion national debt. In November 2022, Bankman-Fried participated in an interview with Vox writer Kelsey Piper over Twitter private messages. He said that he and his company's advocacy for crypto regulation was not sincere and was "just PR", adding that regulators "make everything worse" and "don't protect customers at all". On his "ethics stuff", he agreed it was "mostly a front" and described ethics as a "dumb game we woke Westerners play where we say all the right shibboleths and so everyone likes us". He later claimed to have been referring to ESG, CSR, and greenwashing, as opposed to effective altruism, anti-malaria nets, and pandemic prevention.

=== Bankruptcy of FTX ===
In November 2022, Binance CEO Changpeng Zhao revealed on Twitter that his firm intended to sell its holdings of FTT, FTX's token, which triggered a spike in customer withdrawals from FTX that FTX was unable to fulfill, much like a bank run. Binance received $529 million worth of FTT as part of a sale of its equity in FTX in 2021. Zhao published his tweet soon after a report from CoinDesk stating that the bulk of the holdings of Alameda, Bankman-Fried's trading firm, were in FTT. Bloomberg and TechCrunch reported that any sale by Binance would likely have an outsized impact on FTT's price because of the token's low trading volume. The announcement by Zhao of the pending sale and disputes between Zhao and Bankman-Fried on Twitter led to a decline in the price of FTT and other cryptocurrencies. Shortly before, Zhao had criticized Bankman-Fried's lobbying efforts.

On November 8, Zhao announced that Binance had entered into a nonbinding agreement to purchase FTX due to a liquidity crisis at FTX. Zhao stated that Binance would complete due diligence soon and that all crypto exchanges should avoid using tokens as collateral. He also wrote that he expected FTT to be "highly volatile in the coming days as things develop". On the day of the announcement, FTT lost 80 percent of its value. On November 9, the Wall Street Journal reported that Binance had decided not to acquire FTX. Binance cited reports of FTX's mishandling of customer funds and pending investigations of FTX as the reasons the firm would not pursue the deal. Amid the crisis, Bankman-Fried was no longer a billionaire, according to the Bloomberg Billionaires Index. The very next day, Bloomberg reported that the Securities and Exchange Commission and Commodity Futures Trading Commission were investigating FTX and the nature of its connections to Bankman-Fried's other holdings.

On November 11, 2022, FTX, Alameda Research, and more than 130 associated legal entities declared bankruptcy. Anonymous sources cited by Reuters stated that, earlier in 2022, Bankman-Fried had transferred at least $4 billion from FTX to Alameda Research without any disclosure to the companies' insiders or the public. The sources said that the money transferred included customer funds and that it was ostensibly backed by FTT and shares in Robinhood. An anonymous source cited by The Wall Street Journal stated that Bankman-Fried had disclosed that Alameda owed FTX about $10 billion, which was secured through customer funds held by FTX when FTX had, at the time, $16 billion in customer assets. According to anonymous sources cited by The Wall Street Journal, the Chief Executive of Alameda Research, Caroline Ellison, told employees that Bankman-Fried was aware that FTX had lent its customers' money to Alameda to help it meet its liabilities.

Bankman-Fried resigned as CEO of FTX on November 11, 2022, and was immediately replaced by John J. Ray III, who from 2004 to 2009 had chaired the effort to recover Enron assets for creditors through litigation against numerous banks in the Enron Bankruptcy case. FTX and related entities filed for bankruptcy in Delaware on the same day.

One day after FTX declared bankruptcy, on November 12, Bankman-Fried was interviewed by the Royal Bahamas Police Force. On November 17, Ray stated in a sworn declaration submitted in bankruptcy court that according to the firm's records, Alameda Research had lent $1 billion to Bankman-Fried, adding, "Never in my career have I seen such a complete failure of corporate controls and such a complete absence of trustworthy financial information."

In the testimony Bankman-Fried had prepared to present in December 2022 to the House Financial Services Committee, he maintained that "[FTX] is solvent" but he was "pressured" by FTX general counsel and former partner at the Sullivan & Cromwell law firm, Ryne Miller, to declare bankruptcy. He also implied that the managing team and the law firms managing the bankruptcy were using the Enron precedent in an effort to reap inordinately large amounts of fees from the process. After his arrest and imprisonment, he did not testify in Congress; John J. Ray III testified instead.

== Arrest and charges ==
On December 12, 2022, Bankman-Fried was arrested shortly after 6:00 p.m. in his apartment complex in New Providence, Bahamas, by the Royal Bahamas Police Force, with the expectation that he would be extradited to the United States to face trial. The arrest took place the day before Bankman-Fried was scheduled to appear before the U.S. House Committee on Financial Services, but Forbes obtained and published his prepared testimony.

Earlier that day, the Southern District of New York had charged Bankman-Fried with wire fraud, wire fraud conspiracy, securities fraud, securities fraud conspiracy, and money laundering. Philip Davis, the Prime Minister of The Bahamas, commented on the arrest that "The Bahamas and the United States have a shared interest in holding accountable all individuals associated with FTX who may have betrayed the public trust and broken the law ... [W]hile the United States is pursuing criminal charges against SBF individually, The Bahamas will continue its own regulatory and criminal investigations into the collapse of FTX". Braden Perry, a former senior trial lawyer at the Commodity Futures Trading Commission, opined that a conviction on any of the charges might result in a prison sentence of years or even decades.

After being held at Fox Hill Prison in Nassau for ten days, Bankman-Fried consented to his extradition from The Bahamas to the United States to face charges. He was allowed to remain free on a $250 million bond, the largest such bond ever set in an American criminal proceeding. Among the conditions was that he would stay at his parents' home in California.

On January 3, 2023, Bankman-Fried pled "not guilty" to fraud and the other charges. On February 1, 2023, the judge presiding over his case, Judge Lewis Kaplan, tightened the bail conditions and forbade Bankman-Fried from contacting current or former employees of FTX without attorneys present. The restriction was imposed as Judge Kaplan considered his contact with a potential witness as a "material threat of inappropriate contact with prospective witnesses", and hinted Bankman-Fried might deserve to be jailed pending trial.

Four additional criminal charges levied against Bankman-Fried were announced on February 23, 2023, primarily focused on his making "more than 300 illegal political donations." A March 2023 indictment accused Bankman-Fried and others that they had "directed and caused the transfer" of at least $40 million in cryptocurrency to Chinese government officials, in order to unfreeze accounts of Alameda Research. In July, prosecutors dropped a campaign finance charge filed against him due to treaty obligations to The Bahamas created by his extradition. In a separate illegal campaign finance indictment in August, Bankman-Fried was accused of using $100 million in stolen funds of FTX customers towards 2022 U.S. elections campaign contributions.

== United States v. Bankman-Fried ==
The trial began on October 3, 2023, at the Daniel Patrick Moynihan United States Courthouse in Manhattan, presided over by Judge Lewis Kaplan. Bankman-Fried faced seven counts of fraud and conspiracy. The Guardian summarized the trial as a question of "whether Bankman-Fried is a crypto criminal mastermind or just an unlucky 'math nerd'". Bankman-Fried was accused of having "stole[n] billions from thousands of people" by funnelling customers' money from FTX into Alameda to fund investments, loan repayments, real estate, and political donations. The defense, on the other hand, told the story of a young but earnest entrepreneur critically out of his depth. Bankman-Fried, they said, worked 12 to 22 hours a day, "didn't drink or party", and wanted to fund more work on pandemic prevention. A series of mistakes from him and his inexperienced executive team, a devastating market crash, and adversarial action from external parties caused his companies to spiral into bankruptcy. But at no point, they insisted, was there intention to commit fraud.

Over a dozen witnesses testified for the prosecution, including FTX executives Caroline Ellison, Gary Wang, and Nishad Singh, as part of plea deals. For his plea bargain, Wang testified that "with some simple tweaks to computer code," he helped Alameda Research misappropriate as much as $65 billion from FTX customers and that he "lied about this to the public." Nearly all the testimony for the defense was provided by the defendant, with small contributions from a risk management expert and a Bahamian lawyer.

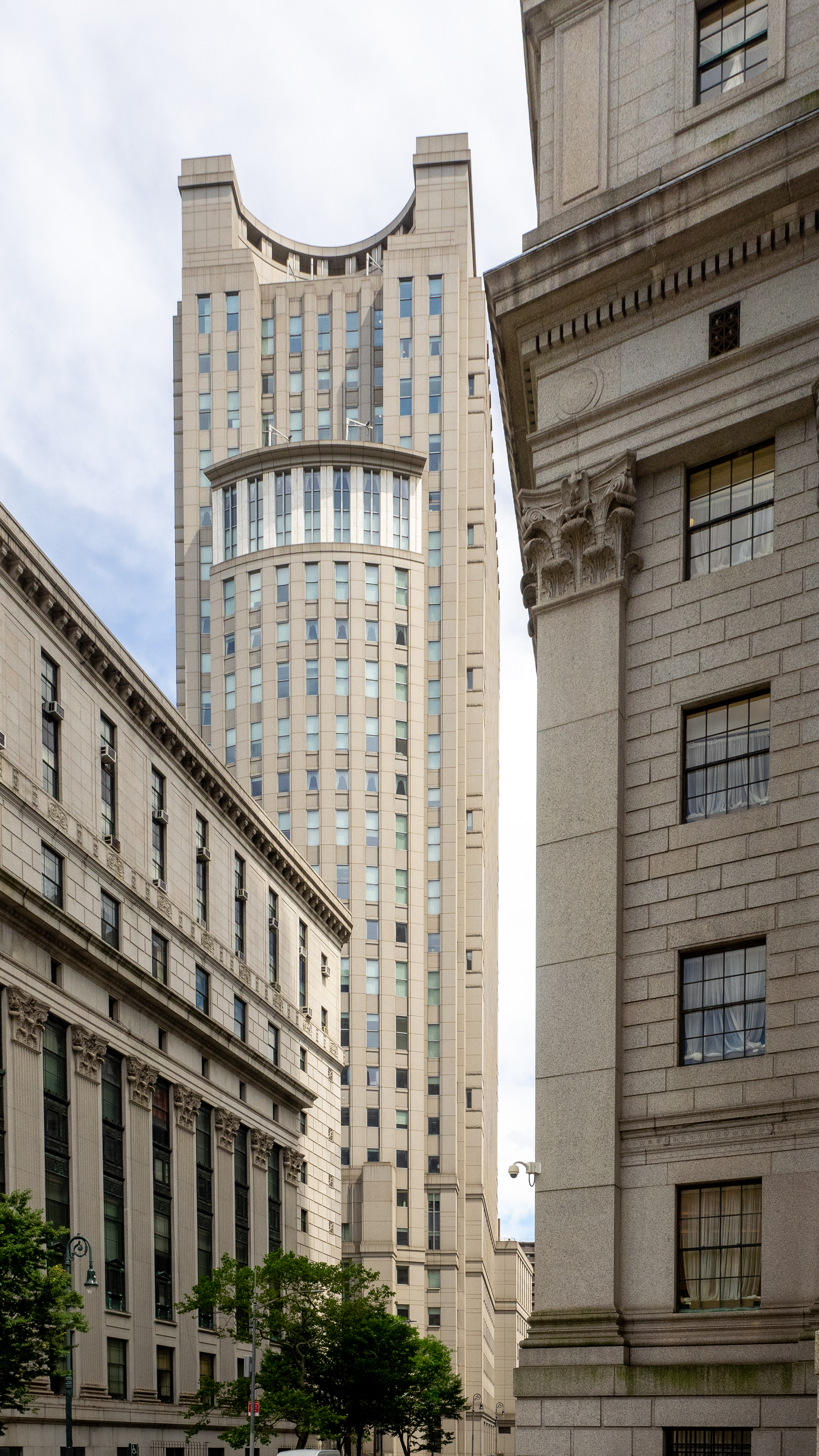
Daniel Patrick Moynihan U.S. Courthouse

The case revolved largely around two ways that Alameda was able to access the funds of other FTX customers. The first was the line of credit Alameda had on the exchange. A credit line is a relatively common facility that enables an entity to function more efficiently as a liquidity provider, and margin traders on FTX were generally allowed to borrow from one another and do as they pleased with the borrowed funds. However, Alameda's credit line was "essentially unlimited", and it was exempt from posting collateral on the exchange to formally secure the borrows. Senior engineers testified that they had added these features at the direction of their CEO. Bankman-Fried contended that he had merely requested something that would prevent erroneous liquidation. He was not aware of the specific solution implemented, he said, although he was aware that Alameda ultimately borrowed "around $2 billion" this way.

Bankman-Fried also denied knowledge of a crucial part of the second way that Alameda accessed customer funds. Before FTX had a bank account, it had used Alameda and other payment processors to receive fiat deposits from customers. "What I believed is that either the funds were just being held in a bank account and not used or moved, or that they were being sent to FTX in one way or another," Bankman-Fried testified. He assumed that if Alameda had been spending the funds, that would have been reflected as a borrow on Alameda's main account on FTX. Not until October or November 2022, did he claim that he finally confirmed otherwise. The main Alameda account was not tracking these transactions and Alameda had taken $8 billion. Other FTX executives conceded that "it seemed like he might not know" exactly how these funds were being processed and that while FTX's systems were tracking this liability, it was not displayed on the admin user's dashboard. But they also emphasized that ultimately at both businesses, Bankman-Fried was the only individual in charge.

Significant attention was drawn to the contrast between Bankman-Fried's public claims about his companies and the private realities behind them. For example, on November 8, 2022, he had tweeted, "FTX is fine. Assets are fine." One FTX executive said these statements were false after first describing them to prosecutors as true but "misleading" because Bankman-Fried had been careful to talk solvency rather than liquidity. Misleading but technically true statements were a common theme. Bankman-Fried maintained, for instance, that he had never said Alameda was treated the same as other customers in all respects, only that Alameda was not front-running other customers. He also claimed to have only skimmed the "dishonest" balance sheets that Alameda's CEO sent to lenders and the defense made a great effort to demonstrate her autonomy in the role, the prime example being her refusal to follow Bankman-Fried's advice to hedge against a market downturn.

=== Trial conclusion ===
The trial ended on November 2, 2023, with the jury pronouncing Bankman-Fried guilty on all seven counts. The sentencing hearing was scheduled for March 28, 2024. Federal criminal court sentencing experts speculated on potential amount of prison time likely to be meted out. On March 28, 2024, the court sentenced Bankman-Fried to 25 years in prison. Under provisions of the First Step Act and in conjunction with other time credit programs, Bankman-Fried may actually serve approximately 18 years. The court ordered the defendant to pay the sum of $11.02 billion in forfeiture for engaging in a series of fraudulent actions against customers and investors. In preparation for his incarceration, Bankman-Fried engaged the services of prison consultant Sam Mangel.

=== Second trial dismissed ===
A second trial, on five charges including bank fraud and bribery, was originally scheduled for early March 2024. These charges were brought by federal prosecutors after Bankman-Fried was extradited from the Bahamas in December 2022. He had asked for these charges to be dismissed because they were not part of the extradition agreement with Bahamian authorities, or alternatively he requested that they be resolved under a separate trial.

Prosecutors announced on December 30, 2023, that they would not proceed to a second trial, stating that its benefits would be outweighed by the "strong public interest" to promptly resolve the case. Furthermore, a second trial would not affect how much time Bankman-Fried could face in prison under recommended federal guidelines.

=== Appeal ===
On April 11, 2024, Bankman-Fried appealed his conviction and the 25-year prison sentence. The appeals process could take years and would require convincing higher courts that Judge Lewis Kaplan made significant errors that deprived Bankman-Fried of his legal rights and made the trial unfair.

On September 13, 2024, Bankman-Fried requested a new trial, claiming Judge Kaplan was biased. His lawyers argued the judge mocked their defense and criticized their questioning in front of the jury. They also alleged the judge pressured jurors to reach a quick verdict by offering meals and rides home on the first day of deliberations.

On November 4, 2025, a federal appeals court in New York heard an argument by Bankman-Fried's attorney that his conviction for fraud should be overturned because he was "presumed guilty." On June 12, 2026, Bankman-Fried's appeal was denied.

On June 12, 2026, the United States Court of Appeals for the Second Circuit affirmed Bankman-Fried's conviction and 25-year prison sentence, as well as the approximately $11 billion forfeiture order. In September 2026, Bankman-Fried filed a petition for certiorari in the Supreme Court of the United States seeking reversal of his conviction and a new trial, arguing that the trial court improperly restricted evidence concerning whether FTX and Alameda had sufficient assets to repay customers. He also argued that the forfeiture order violated the Eighth Amendment's prohibition against excessive fines.

== Incarceration history: plea for pardon ==
Prior to August 11, 2023, Bankman-Fried was out on bail and living with his parents under court-ordered restrictions. On July 26, 2023, prosecutors alleged witness tampering after Bankman-Fried gave a reporter personal writings of former Alameda Research CEO Caroline Ellison. Three weeks later, on August 11, after Judge Kaplan concluded that witness tampering had likely occurred, he revoked Bankman-Fried's bail; Bankman-Fried was led from the courtroom in handcuffs and remanded into custody at the Metropolitan Detention Center, Brooklyn (MDC Brooklyn).

On August 22, 2023, Bankman-Fried's counsel averred that his client was not being provided a vegan diet and that his medications for ADHD and depression were running low. He added that Bankman-Fried could not prepare for the trial subsisting on bread, water, and peanut butter. By November 2023, it was reported he had access to a vegetarian diet and prescription drugs and that he was participating in the "mack" economy by buying packets of mackerel from the prison commissary and exchanging them for services from other prisoners, such as a haircut. After his trial conviction and sentencing, Bankman-Fried was assigned register number 37244-510. He requested to remain incarcerated in MDC Brooklyn while he pursued an appeal. As of late September 2024, he was assigned to the same dormitory-style cell as Sean Combs.

In March 2025, while interviewed in prison by Tucker Carlson, Bankman-Fried made an "indirect pitch to Mr. Trump" to pardon his case, emphasizing his donations to Republican causes, an effort to which his parents have engaged lawyers connected, as reported in The New York Times, to Trump and tasked to "explore executive clemency." Bankman-Fried blamed his conviction on "Biden's lawfare machine". The interview had not been sanctioned by the prison's authorities and he was immediately placed in solitary confinement. He was then moved out of the New York area to the Federal Correctional Institution, Terminal Island, a low-security federal prison in Los Angeles. On his X account, Bankman-Fried posts praises for the Trump administration's policies on drug pricing, the management of the economy, and the crypto sector, as well as its various industry policies.

== Donations ==
=== Politics ===
==== 2020 and earlier ====
Bankman-Fried's only campaign finance activity prior to 2019 was a $1,000 contribution in 2010 to Michael Bennet. For the 2020 U.S. elections, he contributed $5.2 million to two super PACs that supported the Joe Biden 2020 presidential campaign. Bankman-Fried was the second-largest individual donor to Biden in the 2020 election cycle, after Michael Bloomberg.

==== 2021–2022 ====
Contributions were made to both U.S. political parties, with SBF saying he gave an equal amount. For Democrats, Bankman-Fried donated $27 million to Protect Our Future, a Democratic PAC. During the 2021–22 election cycle, he gave $990,000 to Democrat candidates and $38.8m to outside groups, according to public records.

Public records showed donations to Republican Party campaigns in the 2021–22 cycle of $262,200, including donations to senators Susan Collins of Maine, Mitt Romney of Utah, Lisa Murkowski of Alaska, and Ben Sasse of Nebraska. Journalist Matthew Kassel says that Bankman-Fried had often donated to politicians who cultivate good Israel–United States relations but concluded "it is unclear if his backing of pro-Israel candidates was coincidental or motivated by any personal interest in Middle East policy." Bankman-Fried said he donated additional money to Republicans through dark money channels. "All my Republican donations were dark," he said because the press were "super liberal" and he wanted to keep it secret.

==== 2022 U.S. midterm elections ====
Bankman-Fried was the second-largest individual donor to Democratic causes for the 2022 U.S. elections, with total donations of $39.8 million, only behind George Soros, of which $27 million was given to the Protect Our Future PAC. Additional recipients included The Next 50 PAC, Guarding Against Pandemics PAC, and the leadership PAC for Brendan Boyle. Bankman-Fried said in February 2022 that his political contributions were not aimed at influencing his policy goals for the cryptocurrency ecosystem; however, FTX was circulating a list of suggestions to policymakers at the time. He said in an interview that he would prefer the Commodity Futures Trading Commission take a larger role in regulating and guiding the crypto industry. According to The New York Times, the CFTC has a reputation for favoring relatively relaxed regulations for the industry when contrasted with other regulators like the Securities and Exchange Commission.

Bankman-Fried pushed for regulations via the proposed Digital Commodities Consumer Protection Act (DCCPA) by extensively lobbying Congress, which was perceived as being favorable to FTX but harmful to the broader industry, especially its decentralized finance competitors. In May 2022, Bankman-Fried stated that he planned to spend "north of $100 million" in the 2024 presidential election with a "soft ceiling" of $1 billion. In October 2022, he walked back his pledged spending, calling it a "dumb quote on my part". However, in Going Infinite, Michael Lewis revealed that Bankman-Fried had begun to investigate the legality of directly paying Donald Trump not to run for president in 2024, with Trump's team allegedly giving a potential figure of $5 billion.

In the aftermath of the FTX scandal, recipients of Bankman-Fried's and other FTX executives' political campaign contributions have been donating equal amounts to charitable organizations. Elected officials doing so include Senator Kirsten Gillibrand, as well as Representatives Chuy García and Kevin Hern. A spokesperson for former Texas gubernatorial candidate Beto O'Rourke said that his campaign had received a $1 million donation from Bankman-Fried in October 2022 but returned the funds in early November, prior to the election.

=== Pandemic prevention contributions and related controversy ===
Bankman-Fried and his younger brother, Gabriel, contributed toward pandemic prevention initiatives, according to an investigative report by The Washington Post. One funding recipient was the Guarding Against Pandemics PAC, founded by Gabriel. On May 15, 2022, FTX announced it had donated $18 million to support "TOGETHER Trial," a private, international, research consortium conducting clinical trials to test existing drugs as treatments for various conditions, including COVID-19.

On July 20, 2023, an Insiders Avoidance Complaint was filed against Bankman-Fried and three former FTX/Alameda senior executives seeking to recover "hundreds of millions of dollars that Defendants misappropriated." The plaintiffs were FTX Trading Ltd., Alameda Research LLC, Alameda Research Ltd., North Dimension Inc., Cottonwood Grove Ltd., and Realm Shires, Inc. Their complaint stated that Guarding Against Pandemics—which received $35 million from Bankman-Fried between October 2021 and May 2022—and its associated political action committee "needless to say, did nothing to prevent pandemics."

=== Attempts to recoup donations ===
In December 2022, FTX's new management commenced efforts to "claw back" donations that had been made to politicians, celebrities, and charities as part of its bankruptcy proceedings. The company announced that it "intends to...require the return of such payments, with interest accruing from the date any action is commenced." Reports on this development included the assessment that "clawing back payments made to politicians and charities is likely to be one of the easier parts of the bankruptcy process," on the basis of U.S. legislation that presumes "payments or transfers made within 90 days of bankruptcy to be preferential if they result in a creditor getting more than it would have been entitled to at the end of the bankruptcy process," with the caveat that a "clawback can attempt to recover the difference in the payments."

By April 2023, $7.3 billion of the original $8 billion in missing funds had been recuperated in liquid assets. While an anonymous bidder reportedly valued the remaining portfolio at "at least $2 billion", Bloomberg's Matt Levine noted that "'We lucked into enough money to pay everyone back' is not a legal defense to fraud". In October 2023, FTX and its affiliated debtors revealed a proposed settlement of customer-property disputes, set to be presented for approval to the competent bankruptcy court. Accounting for both priority and non-priority claims against FTX, the settlement's parties offered their estimate that customers of FTX.com and FTX US would receive, collectively, over 90% of distributable value worldwide.

== Personal life ==
Bankman-Fried is vegan. He was raised in a Jewish family. In mid-2021 it was reported that he lived with approximately 10 roommates in a five-bedroom Bahamian penthouse bought by co-CEO of FTX Ryan Salame. After FTX's collapse, the penthouse was put up for sale for close to $40 million. Bankman-Fried had a relationship with Alameda Research CEO Caroline Ellison that lasted around six months and ended on April 15, 2022. While testifying against him in court in October 2023, she claimed that his hairstyle and clothes were part of a "well calculated" image that he tried to project. She stated that Bankman-Fried believed he had received higher bonuses while working at Jane Street because of his hair and used his appearance as "an important part" of FTX's "narrative and image." In court, he appeared with trimmed hair and wearing a grey suit.

Bankman-Fried once played the video game League of Legends while on a call attempting to secure an investment from Sequoia Capital, talking about how FTX would become a "super app." The investors were "incredibly impressed," with one calling the call "one of those your-hair-is-blown-back type of meetings." Afterward, Sequoia ended up investing over $200 million in FTX. An article in the Financial Times later characterized Bankman-Fried's "win ratios" in League of Legends as "average-to-bad".

Τhroughout the legal process, Bankman-Fried's parents stood by him, writing in a December 2022 letter, around the time of the arrest, "You are innocent." In an e-mail to The New Yorker, his mother, Barbara Fried, denounced the actions of the prosecution and the bankruptcy team as "McCarthyite" and a "relentless pursuit of total destruction," which is enabled by "a credulous public." After Bankman-Fried was incarcerated during the trial, his parents took turns traveling every Tuesday from California to be with him at the Brooklyn jail where he awaited the outcome of his trial, and the sentencing phase. She wrote a letter to the judge in February 2024 arguing for lenient sentencing, saying that Bankman-Fried would face extreme danger in prison because he has "trouble responding appropriately to many social cues".
