= MathPath =

American math education program

The MathPath logo

MathPath is a mathematics enrichment summer program for students ages 11–14 (middle-school age in the US). It is four weeks long, and moves to a different location each year. MathPath is visited by mathematicians such as John H. Conway and Francis Su. It was probably the original, and is still one of the few, international residential high-end summer camps exclusively for mathematics and exclusively for students of middle school age.

== History ==
MathPath was founded in 2002 by George Rubin Thomas, who had previously founded Mathcamp for high school students and has since founded Epsiloncamp for children age 7–11 (in 2011, originally aged 8–11) and Delta Camp for children 6 and 7 (in 2014 and 2015, now merged with Epsilon Camp). His goal was to inspire and advance the most mathematically gifted middle school age students, through a summer camp.

== Subjects ==
At MathPath, students learn about many math topics that are rarely taught in American schools, or not taught in much depth, such as non-Euclidean geometry, advanced Euclidean geometry, number theory, combinatorics, induction, spherical trigonometry, mathematical origami, and the mathematics of card shuffling. They also learn some history of math and work on mathematical writing. Topics vary somewhat each year, depending on instructor interest. As well, students have the opportunity to prepare for contests such as MATHCOUNTS, AMC, or AIME.

== Staff ==
Some staff are regular annual participants. Usually they come for 2–4 weeks, but a few come for only one week. Notable regular staff include the late John Horton Conway, Sam Vandervelde, and Glen Van Brummelen.

Visiting staff are participants for one year or occasional years. Usually they attend for one week or a day or two to give a few lectures. Often, they are faculty at the host institution or nearby institutions. Notable visiting mathematicians have included Gene Abrams and Robin Hartshorne.

== Admissions ==
MathPath is selective. The primary criterion for admission is the applicant's work on the yearly Qualifying Test, though academic and nonacademic references are also required.

== Philosophy ==
The pedagogy of MathPath is one that is not focused on acceleration, rather on enrichment. It also has a heavy emphasis on proofs, which is rare in contemporary mathematical education at the middle school level. Additionally, MathPath is quite stringent on electronics, with paperwork required to bring in electronics, and any technology besides phones to communicate with family effectively banned from the camp.

== Locations ==
- 2002 – Black Hills State University, Spearfish, SD
- 2003 – Black Hills State University, Spearfish, SD
- 2004 – Roger Williams University, Bristol, RI
- 2005 – Colorado College, Colorado Springs, CO
- 2006 – University of California, Santa Cruz, CA
- 2007 – Colorado College, Colorado Springs, CO
- 2008 – The University of Vermont at Burlington
- 2009 – Colorado College, Colorado Springs, CO
- 2010 – Macalester College, St. Paul, MN
- 2011 – Colorado College, Colorado Springs, CO
- 2012 – Mount Holyoke College, South Hadley, MA
- 2013 – Macalester College, St. Paul, MN
- 2014 – Mount Holyoke College, South Hadley, MA
- 2015 - Lewis & Clark College, Portland, OR
- 2016 - Macalester College, St. Paul, MN
- 2017 - Mount Holyoke College, South Hadley, MA
- 2018 - Lewis & Clark College, Portland, OR
- 2019 - Grand Valley State University, Allendale, MI
- 2020 and 2021 - Held online due to coronavirus concerns.
- 2022 - Mount Holyoke College, South Hadley, MA
- 2023 - University of Portland, Portland, OR
- 2024 - Rockhurst University, Kansas City, MO
- 2025 - Mount Holyoke College, South Hadley, MA
