= John J. Ray III =

American attorney and CEO (born 1959)

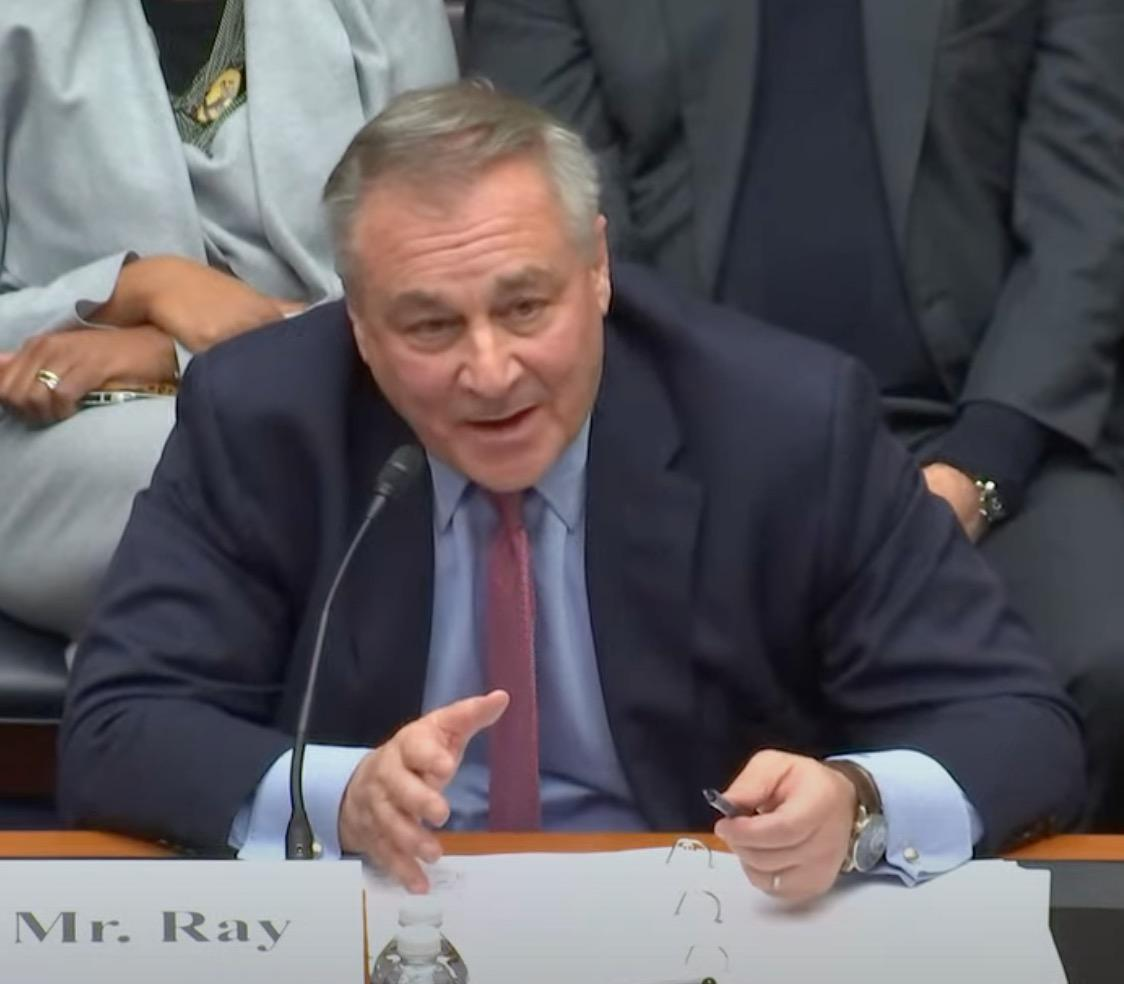
- Ray testifying to the United States House Committee on Financial Services, December 2022
- Born: January 1959 (age 67)
- Education: University of Massachusetts Amherst (BA); Drake University (JD)
- Occupations: Attorney; CEO of FTX

John J. Ray III (born January 1959) is an American attorney and CEO who specializes in recovering funds from failed corporations. He served as chairman of Enron Creditors Recovery Corp., a company tasked with recovering creditor funds from Enron in the wake of its accounting scandal and subsequent collapse. He currently serves as the CEO of bankrupt cryptocurrency exchange FTX, having been appointed in the aftermath of its November 2022 collapse.

== Early life and education ==
Ray grew up in Pittsfield, Massachusetts. He is the son of union plumber John J. Ray Jr. and his wife Florence. He graduated from the University of Massachusetts Amherst cum laude and Drake University Law School second in his class making the Dean's List.

== Career ==
Ray started his career at Touche Ross, an accounting firm that later merged into Deloitte, before moving to the law firm Mayer Brown in 1984 and then to Waste Management. Soon after he was hired as general counsel of Fruit of the Loom in 1998, the clothing company posted massive losses and filed for Chapter 11 bankruptcy reorganization, with Ray managing the sale of the firm's assets.

Having led one reorganization, Ray formed Avidity Partners LLC, a firm specializing in serving as a receiver, trustee and claims agent in insolvency proceedings. Clients included AbitibiBowater, National Century Financial Enterprises, and Pac-West Telecomm. He formed a new firm, Greylock Partners, providing similar services to Nortel, Residential Capital, Overseas Shipholding and others. In 2019, Greylock changed its name to Owl Hill Advisory.

After Enron emerged from its Chapter 11 bankruptcy in 2004, Ray was appointed to chair the effort to recover assets for creditors through litigation against numerous banks. He served in that role through 2009. Under Ray’s leadership, the company returned $828.9 million to its creditors, which Ray said was nearly 52 cents on the dollar.

Starting in 2010, Ray was the principal officer of the bankrupt Canadian telecommunications company Nortel.

In 2014, Ray was appointed as an independent board member for GT Advanced Technologies.

In 2016, Ray managed a trust which liquidated the assets of the major subprime mortgage services company Residential Capital.

When cryptocurrency company FTX declared Chapter 11 bankruptcy on November 11, 2022, Ray was appointed to succeed Sam Bankman-Fried as the company's CEO. Six days later, in a filing with the United States Bankruptcy Court for the District of Delaware, Ray stated that in over 40 years of his experience in dealing with insolvencies, he had never encountered "such a complete failure of corporate controls and such a complete absence of trustworthy financial information as occurred here". In addition, he stated that FTX was managed by "a very small group of inexperienced, unsophisticated and potentially compromised individuals".

According to FTX's court disclosures, the company pays Ray $1,300 per hour and a $200,000 retainer fee.
