= Sam Trabucco =

American business executive

John Samuel Trabucco is an American business executive. He was co-CEO of Alameda Research, a defunct quantitative trading firm founded by Sam Bankman-Fried before FTX. Caroline Ellison was Alameda's other co-CEO. Trabucco stepped down from Alameda in August 2022, leaving Ellison as sole CEO until its bankruptcy along with FTX three months later.

== Early life and education ==
Trabucco attended a Mount Holyoke College math camp in 2010 where he met Sam Bankman-Fried. Trabucco received his bachelor's in mathematics and computer science from Massachusetts Institute of Technology (MIT). There he also served as president of the undergrad math association and reconnected with Bankman-Fried.

== Career ==
After graduation, he worked for Susquehanna International Group, a quantitative trading firm. He joined Alameda Research in March 2019, and officially became the co-CEO in October 2021 along with Caroline Ellison. The following August, Trabucco stepped down from the role and Caroline Ellison became the sole CEO of the firm. Alameda Research purchased a 52-foot yacht for Trabucco, who named it Soak My Deck.

In 2024, court filings in the FTX bankruptcy proceedings revealed that Trabucco had reached a settlement with U.S. authorities, agreeing to forfeit assets worth approximately $80 million, including two San Francisco apartments, a yacht, and claims against FTX. He also agreed to transfer rights to about $70 million in claims against the exchange. Filings indicated that he had received approximately $20 million in cash compensation during his time at Alameda, and had realized tens of millions more through token sales and withdrawals. Unlike other senior FTX and Alameda executives, Trabucco was not criminally charged and did not testify in court.

The settlement was subject to approval by a federal judge in Delaware, with a hearing scheduled for December 12, 2024. FTX debtors stated that they believed they had strong claims against Trabucco but opted to settle to avoid costly and time-consuming litigation. The agreement included the transfer of legal title to the properties and other assets, including a 53-foot HCB Suenos yacht purchased in March 2022. If approved, the settlement would allow him to avoid further civil litigation from FTX's estate.

He also wrote crossword puzzles for The New York Times.

== Recognition ==
- 2022: Named in Forbes 30 Under 30⁣ – North America – Finance
