= Securities Commission of the Bahamas =

Agency overview
- Formed: 1995; 31 years ago
- Preceding agency: Securities Board of the Bahamas
- Headquarters: Nassau, Bahamas
- Employees: 88 (2022)
- Agency executives: Neville Adderley, Chairman; Christina Rolle, Executive Director
- Parent agency: Ministry of Finance (The Bahamas)
- Website: www.scb.gov.bs

The Securities Commission of the Bahamas (SCB, formerly the Securities Board of the Bahamas) is an agency responsible for financial regulation of investment funds, securities, and capital markets in the Bahamas. Among other responsibilities, it enforces the Financial and Corporate Service Providers Act, the Digital Assets and Registered Exchanges (DARE) Act, and the Carbon Credits Trading Act. Its members are appointed by the Minister of Finance.

As of 2015, SCB oversaw more than 1,000 firms. That year, the commission accepted a two-year position as chair of the Caribbean Group of Securities Regulators.

== History ==
SCB was established in 1995 by the Securities Board Act, but its mandate is now provided for by the 2011 Securities Industry Act. Its offices are at Poinciana House on East Bay Street, Nassau.

In 2000, the OECD placed the Bahamas on a blacklist of countries that facilitate tax evasion. The Bahamian authorities have passed several new laws, resulting in the OECD moving the country to the "grey list", meaning non-compliance with international standards.

In 2020, SCB developed and signed two legislative acts: the Digital Assets and Registered Exchanges (DARE) Act and the Financial and Corporate Service Providers Ac, opening the doors for crypto companies. The DARE Act 2020 was cited as the reason for FTX's move to the Bahamas. This law was one of the world's first frameworks to regulate digital assets, but it was superficial in most matters and had many weak points. For example, it didn’t require segregation of user funds from virtual asset service providers (VASPs) own funds.

As of 2022, the registration process for crypto applicants in the Bahamas lasted no more than 30 days.

In 2024, the Digital Assets and Registered Exchanges Act 2024 was introduced. It tightened security requirements, betting services disclosure regime, issuance and management of stable coins, and conflict of interest.

== Leadership ==
Its executive director is Christina Rolle, who has served in this role since January 26, 2015. She was preceded by Hillary H. Deveaux, who served as interim executive director from September 11, 2013, until 2015.

The commission's chairs have included Timothy Donaldson and Tonya Bastian Galanis.

== See also ==
- Bahamas International Securities Exchange
- FTX (company)
- List of financial supervisory authorities by country
