= Matt Levine (columnist) =

American financial columnist (born 1978)

- Born: 1978 (age 47–48)
- Education: Harvard University (BA); Yale University (JD)
- Occupation: Financial columnist
- Years active: 2011–present
- Employer: Bloomberg News
- Known for: Money Stuff
- Children: 3

Matt Levine (born 1978) is a columnist for Bloomberg News who writes about finance and business. Levine has previously worked as a lawyer, investment banker, law clerk, and has written for a number of newspapers and financial sites. His newsletter, Money Stuff, has around 300,000 subscribers as of January 2024. He is Jewish.

== Education ==
Levine received his A.B. in Classics from Harvard College and later earned his J.D. from Yale Law School.

== Career ==
After graduating from Harvard, Levine initially taught high school Latin. He left teaching to attend law school and subsequently worked as a mergers and acquisitions associate at Wachtell, Lipton, Rosen & Katz. Levine then spent four years at Goldman Sachs as an investment banker, where he structured and marketed corporate equity derivatives. He also served as a law clerk at the U.S. Court of Appeals for the Third Circuit.

In 2011, Levine started writing about economics and finance for the financial news site Dealbreaker. There, he wrote about the "deals, scandals, complexities and personalities of the financial services industry." His analysis of the 2012 JPMorgan Chase trading loss was featured in the Columbia Journalism Review's anthology "The Best Business Writing 2013."

In 2013, Levine joined Bloomberg Opinion as an opinion columnist covering finance and business. He writes the newsletter Money Stuff for Bloomberg, which is published every weekday. Levine's work has been widely referenced by other newspapers.

In 2015, after a column Levine wrote suggested John Paulson's gift to Harvard should have gone to "literally any other charity", quoting Dylan Matthews, Paulson, upset, personally called Michael Bloomberg, who threatened to shutter the op-ed section of Bloomberg News in response. Michael Bloomberg calmed down over the weekend and retracted his threat, but Levine was given a "talking to".

Levine has also contributed to The Wall Street Journal, CNN, The Billfold, and the Planet Money blog. He is known for his humorous, witty, deadpan writing style.

== See also ==
- FT Alphaville
- List of Jewish American journalists
