= Gary Wang (American businessman) =

Co-founder of FTX

- Born: 1993 (age 32–33); China
- Other name: Zixiao Wang
- Education: Massachusetts Institute of Technology (BS)
- Occupations: Computer programmer Entrepreneur
- Known for: FTX

Gary Wang (born c. 1993) is an American computer programmer who was chief technology officer of cryptocurrency exchange FTX, which he founded in 2019 with Sam Bankman-Fried. At his peak in 2022, Wang was ranked the 227th richest American in the Forbes 400, and the 431st richest person in the world by The World's Billionaires. After FTX collapsed into bankruptcy, Wang pleaded guilty to wire fraud and other charges and agreed to testify against Bankman-Fried as part of a cooperation deal that could reduce his sentence. Before co-founding FTX, Wang worked at Google Flights, building systems for the aggregation of ticket prices.

== Early life and education ==
Wang was born in China and moved to the U.S. when he was 8 years old with his parents. After moving as a teen to Cherry Hill, New Jersey, he graduated in 2011 from Cherry Hill High School East. He attended Canada/USA Mathcamp, where he met Bankman-Fried in 2010. After high school, he attended the Massachusetts Institute of Technology (MIT), where he studied mathematics and computer science. At MIT, he was the roommate of Sam Bankman-Fried for three years, and he was a member of Epsilon Theta, a coed fraternity that also included Bankman-Fried. After graduating from MIT, he worked at Google Flights, building systems for the aggregation of ticket prices. When Bankman-Fried cofounded Alameda Research in 2017, Wang reportedly left his role at Google to join his former roommate in that business. In 2019, Bankman-Fried and Wang cofounded FTX.

== FTX ==
At FTX, he was the chief technology officer. He was the second-largest shareholder of FTX at the time of the collapse of the company. Wang owned 17% of FTX and 10% of Alameda Research, a sister firm of FTX and co-founded by Bankman-Fried. Wang was a somewhat reclusive figure, per reports. He was described as brilliant "beyond belief", and so integral that if he left FTX it would collapse. He was happiest when computer programming from home. According to an interview with his parents, Wang "wasn't interested in the communication or management parts of the company. He was only interested in his part of work, [which was] coding.”

On December 18, 2022, Wang pleaded guilty in a plea bargain in the Southern District of New York to wire fraud and three counts of conspiracy involving wire, securities and commodities fraud relating to helping Bankman-Fried defraud FTX customers, for which Bankman-Fried was later sentenced to 25 years in prison. His lawyer, Ilan Graff, stated that "Gary has accepted responsibility for his actions and takes seriously his obligations as a cooperating witness."

As part of his plea bargain, Wang testified in United States v. Sam Bankman-Fried that "with some simple tweaks to computer code," he helped Alameda Research misappropriate as much as $65 billion from FTX customers and that he "lied about this to the public." He said he was directed to alter FTX's code between 2019 and 2022 despite knowing that it would give Alameda Research "special privileges."
