= Celebrezze family =

Italian-American family

The Celebrezze family is an Italian-American family based in Cleveland, Ohio prominent in the fields of law and politics. They are considered a political dynasty, as three generations have held various forms of office on the federal, state, and local levels, encompassing all three branches of government (Executive, Legislative, Judicial).

Notable members include:

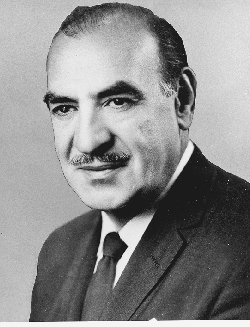
Anthony J. Celebrezze is considered the most prominent member of the family - having served as mayor of Cleveland, a cabinet official under John F. Kennedy and Lyndon B. Johnson, and a federal judge.

- Frank D. Celebrezze (1899–1953), Cleveland municipal judge. Brother of Anthony J. Celebrezze.
  - Frank D. Celebrezze Jr. (more commonly known as simply "Frank") (1928–2010), Justice of the Ohio Supreme Court 1972-1978, Chief Justice of the Ohio Supreme Court 1978-1986, candidate for Judge of Ohio District Court of Appeal 1994. Son of Frank D. Celebrezze I.
    - Frank D. Celebrezze III (more commonly referred to as Frank Jr.) (born 1952), Judge of Court of Common Pleas 1992-2000, Judge of Ohio Court of Appeals, 2001–present. Son of Frank Celebrezze.
  - Gerald J. Celebrezze (1930-1969), Attorney and Judge of Cuyahoga County, Ohio Common Pleas Court. Son of Frank D. Celebrezze I.
    - Bruce D. Celebrezze (1952- ), Attorney and lecturer. Partner at Clyde & Co, LLP. Son of Gerald Celebrezze
    - William A. Celebrezze (1965- ), Attorney and partner at Goetz & Eckland P.A. Board member at Open Arms of Minnesota. Son of Gerald Celebrezze
  - James Celebrezze (1938-2021), Justice of the Ohio Supreme Court 1982-1984, Judge of the Cuyahoga County, Ohio Domestic Relations Court. Son of Frank D. Celebrezze I.
    - Leslie Ann Celebrezze, Cleveland Municipal Court Magistrate; Judge of the Cuyahoga County, Ohio Domestic Relations Court 2009–2025. Resigned from bench, currently facing felony corruption charges. Daughter of James Celebrezze.
    - Nicholas J. Celebrezze, Parma, Ohio Councilman, State Representative. Son of James Celebrezze.
- Anthony J. Celebrezze (1910–1998), Mayor of Cleveland 1958-1962; Secretary of Health, Education, and Welfare 1962-1965; Judge of United States Court of Appeals for the Sixth Circuit 1965–1980. Brother of Frank D. Celebrezze I.
  - Anthony J. Celebrezze Jr. (1941–2003), Ohio State Senator 1975-1979, Ohio Secretary of State 1979-1983, Attorney General of Ohio 1983-1991, candidate for governor of Ohio 1990. Son of Anthony J. Celebrezze.
    - Anthony J. Celebrezze III, candidate for Franklin County, Ohio Clerk 1998. Son of Anthony J. Celebrezze Jr.

== See also ==
- List of United States political families
- Justice Celebrezze (disambiguation)
