= Nicholas J. Celebrezze =

American politician

Member of the Ohio House of Representatives from the 15th district
- In office January 16, 2012 – January 7, 2019
- Preceded by: Timothy J. DeGeeter
- Succeeded by: Jeffrey Crossman

Personal details
- Born: November 22, 1977 (age 48) Parma, Ohio, U.S.
- Party: Democratic
- Relations: James Celebrezze (father); Frank D. Celebrezze I (grandfather)
- Children: 1
- Education: University of Akron; Cleveland–Marshall College of Law
- Profession: Lawyer, Legislator
- Website: votecelebrezze.com

Nicholas John "Nick" Celebrezze (born November 22, 1977) is an Ohio Politician and lawyer. He has served in local government and was a member of the Ohio House of Representatives, representing the 15th District from his appointment in 2012 until 2019. He is a member of Cleveland's famed Celebrezze family, which is known for being an area political dynasty.

== Life and career ==
Celebrezze was born in Parma, Ohio, on November 22, 1977, to Daria and James Celebrezze. His mother was a schoolteacher and his father was a judge and former politician.

Celebrezze completed his undergraduate career at the University of Akron. He received his JD from Cleveland–Marshall College of Law. He began practicing law in 2004 and owns his own firm in Parma. He served on Parma's Charter Commission in 2003. He later served as a councilmember for Ward 3 in Parma.

== Ohio House of Representatives ==
In 2012, Celebrezze announced that he would seek to succeed Timothy J. DeGeeter in the Ohio House of Representatives. DeGeeter, would be leaving his post to seek the position of Mayor of Parma, Ohio. After winning, he resigned from his House seat, and House Democrats subsequently appointed Celebrezze to the seat. He was seated on January 16, 2012. He was on the Local Government and Transportation, Public Safety, and Homeland Security committees.

Celebrezze won a full term to his seat in 2012, defeating Patricia Gasconye with 63% of the vote. He then served two more full terms, and decided not to seek reelection in 2018, citing family concerns.
