= Maxwell Frost =

American politician and activist (born 1997)

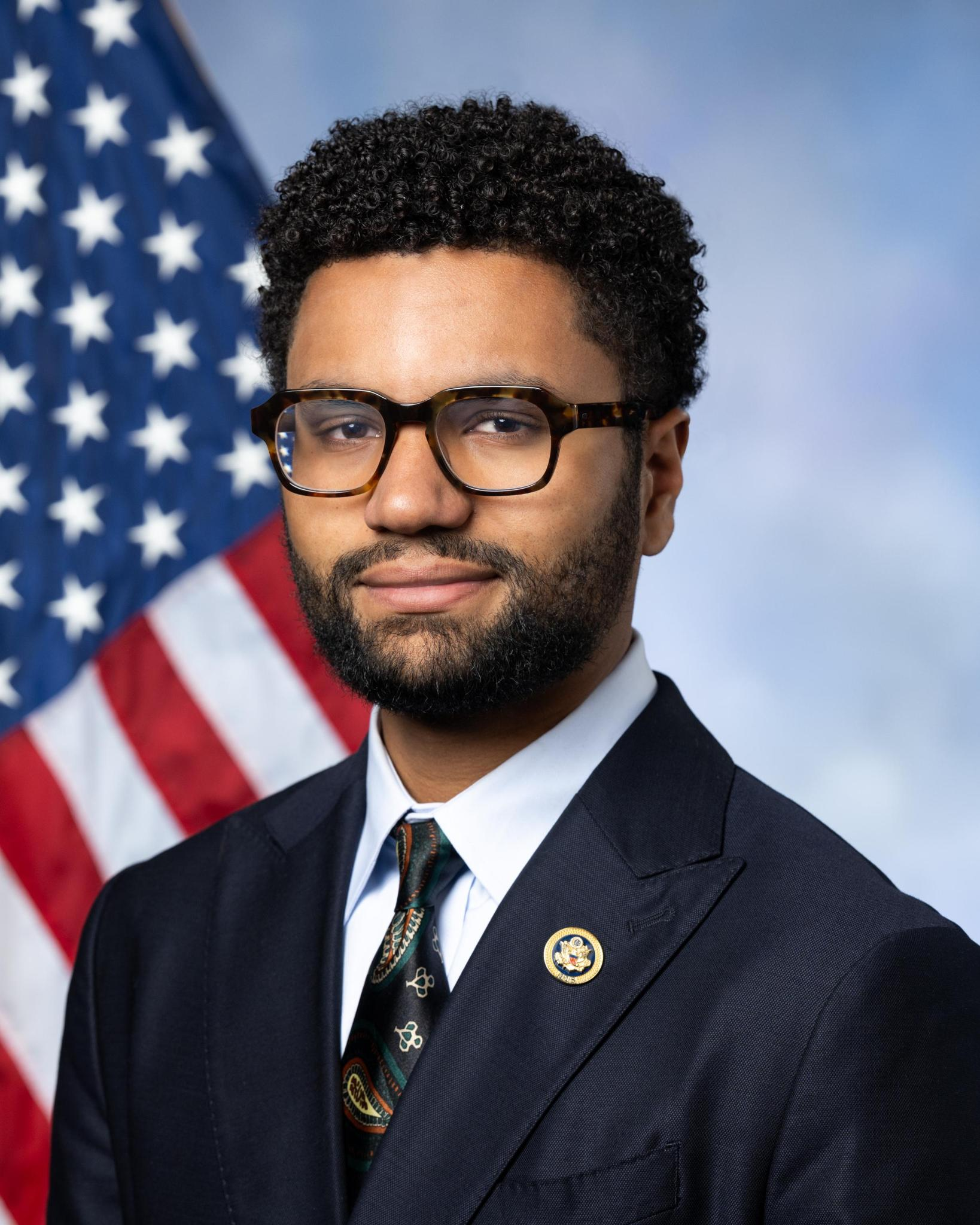
- Official portrait, 2026

Co-Chair of the House Democratic Policy and Communications Committee
- Incumbent
- Assumed office January 3, 2025 Serving with Lori Trahan and Lauren Underwood
- Leader: Hakeem Jeffries
- Preceded by: Veronica Escobar

Member of the U.S. House of Representatives from Florida's 10th district
- Incumbent
- Assumed office January 3, 2023
- Preceded by: Val Demings

Personal details
- Born: Maxwell Alejandro Frost; January 17, 1997 (age 29) Orlando, Florida, U.S.
- Party: Democratic
- Education: Valencia College (attended)
- Website: House website Campaign website
- Frost's voice Frost on the Alligator Alcatraz; Recorded July 16, 2025

Maxwell Alejandro Frost (born January 17, 1997) is an American politician and activist serving as the U.S. representative for Florida's 10th congressional district since 2023. He was the national organizing director for March for Our Lives. He is a member of the Democratic Party.

Frost was first elected to Congress in 2022 at age 25 and is the first Generation Z member of the United States Congress. He was also the youngest member of the House when he took office. Frost has introduced legislation on gun violence prevention and renter protections. During Donald Trump's second term, he has opposed the expansion of immigration detention in Florida and has sought greater congressional oversight of the administration's work.

== Early life ==
Frost was born in Orlando, Florida, on January 17, 1997, to a Puerto Rican mother of Lebanese descent and a Haitian father. His biological mother had several children. He was adopted at birth by Maritza Argibay-Frost, a Cuban immigrant and special education teacher, and Patrick Frost, a Kansas-born musician-producer. He reconnected with his birth mother in June 2021.

Frost attended Osceola County School for the Arts in Kissimmee, Florida. In high school, he was part of the Technology Student Association. He attended Valencia College, but did not graduate. For nearly a decade, Frost participated in the cadet program of the Civil Air Patrol, attaining the rank of cadet major.

== Early career ==
Frost has been organizing since around 2012, when he was active with Barack Obama's 2012 presidential campaign. He also volunteered with the Newtown Action Alliance, an organization created in response to the Sandy Hook Elementary School shooting. He has identified Occupy Wall Street, the Columbine High School massacre, the killing of Trayvon Martin, and the Orlando nightclub shooting as events that affected his thinking. He later volunteered for the campaigns of Bernie Sanders, Hillary Clinton, and Margaret Good.

Frost survived an incident of gun violence at a Halloween event in Downtown Orlando in 2016.

Frost was an organizer with the American Civil Liberties Union and worked to support Florida's 2018 Amendment 4 and to pressure Joe Biden to stop supporting the Hyde Amendment in 2019. He was the national organizing director for March for Our Lives. In November 2021, Frost was arrested at a voting rights rally in Lafayette Square led by William Barber II and Ben Jealous.

== U.S. House of Representatives ==
=== Elections ===
==== 2022 ====
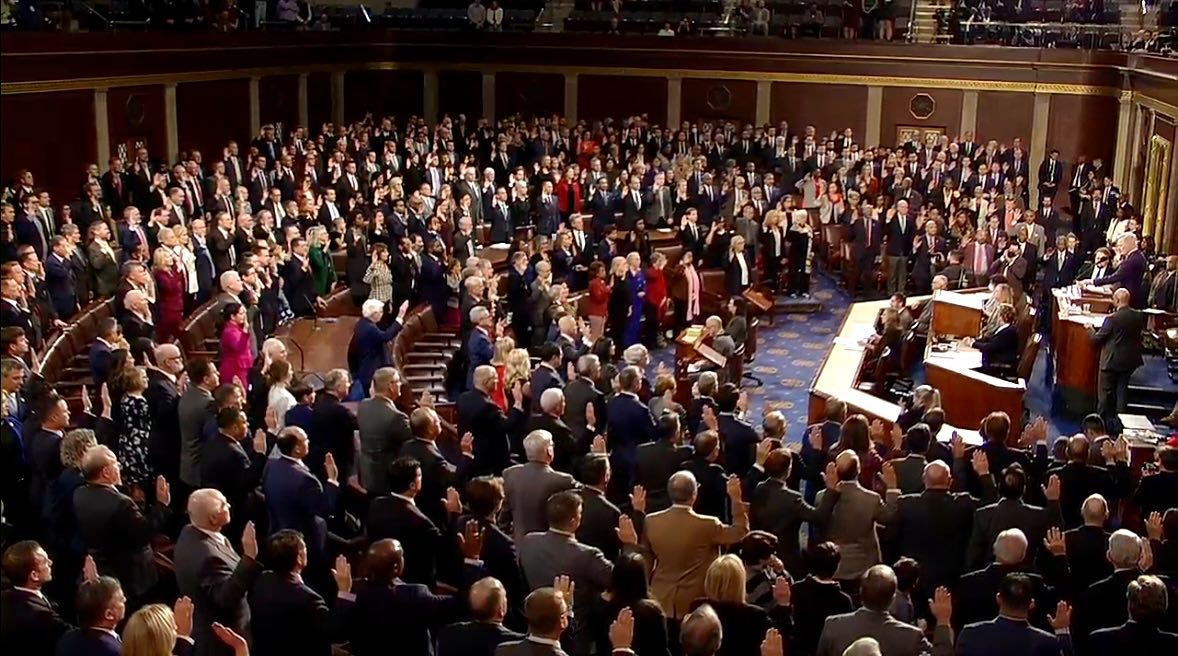
Frost and the 118th Congress are sworn into the U.S. House of Representatives, 2023

In August 2021, Frost announced his candidacy for the Democratic nomination for Florida's 10th congressional district. During the primary campaign, he released a television ad in Spanglish, telling The Hill, "Latinos are in a place where their first language is Spanish but they speak English as well, and quite frankly that's me ... We speak Spanglish in the house, and I know that's the same for a lot of Latino families in the district."

Frost beat state Senator Randolph Bracy and former U.S. Representatives Alan Grayson and Corrine Brown, among others, in the August 23, 2022, primary. Due to the district's Democratic tilt, Frost was expected to win the general election in November 2022, which he did, defeating Republican Calvin Wimbish by a 19% margin, which was smaller than the 32% margin by which Biden won the district in 2020. At 25, Frost became the youngest member of Congress and the first member of Generation Z in the chamber. He was endorsed by numerous national and local political figures, including Jesse Jackson, former NAACP president Ben Jealous, civil-rights activist Dolores Huerta, and U.S. Senators Bernie Sanders and Elizabeth Warren.

==== 2024 ====
Frost was reelected for a second term in 2024. In the Democratic primary in August, he defeated two challengers with 81.8% of the vote.

==== 2026 ====
Frost won reelection by default, as he had no primary challengers or opponents on the general election ballot.

=== Tenure ===
Frost was sworn in as the youngest member of the 118th United States Congress. House Democrats made him co-chair of the House Democrats' Policy and Communications Committee, making him the first Generation Z member of leadership.

He has been critical of the second Trump administration: he helped to lead a group of House Democrats who were denied entry to the Treasury Department over DOGE's control of federal payment systems, and at the Department of Education, he was also blocked from accessing the building. He was barred from an Oversight Committee hearing after describing President Trump as the "grifter in chief," and he staged a walkout of Trump's address to a joint session of congress wearing a shirt that said, "No Kings Live Here." He traveled to El Salvador to press for the release of Kilmar Abrego Garcia, who had been removed from the United States without due process.

Frost introduced the Faster Buses Better Futures Act to bring funding to updating transit systems through federal grant programs. He was against the Laken Riley Act and the One Big Beautiful Bill Act, and opposed the deal ending the 2025 federal government shutdown because of the expiring Affordable Care Act premium tax credits.

=== Committee assignments ===
For the 119th Congress:

- Committee on Oversight and Government Reform
  - Subcommittee on Economic Growth, Energy Policy, and Regulatory Affairs
  - Subcommittee on Government Operations
- Committee on Science, Space, and Technology

=== Caucus memberships ===
- Black Maternal Health Caucus
- Congressional Black Caucus
- Congressional Equality Caucus
- Congressional Caucus for the Equal Rights Amendment
- Congressional Hispanic Caucus
- Congressional Progressive Caucus
- Congressional Freethought Caucus

== Political positions ==
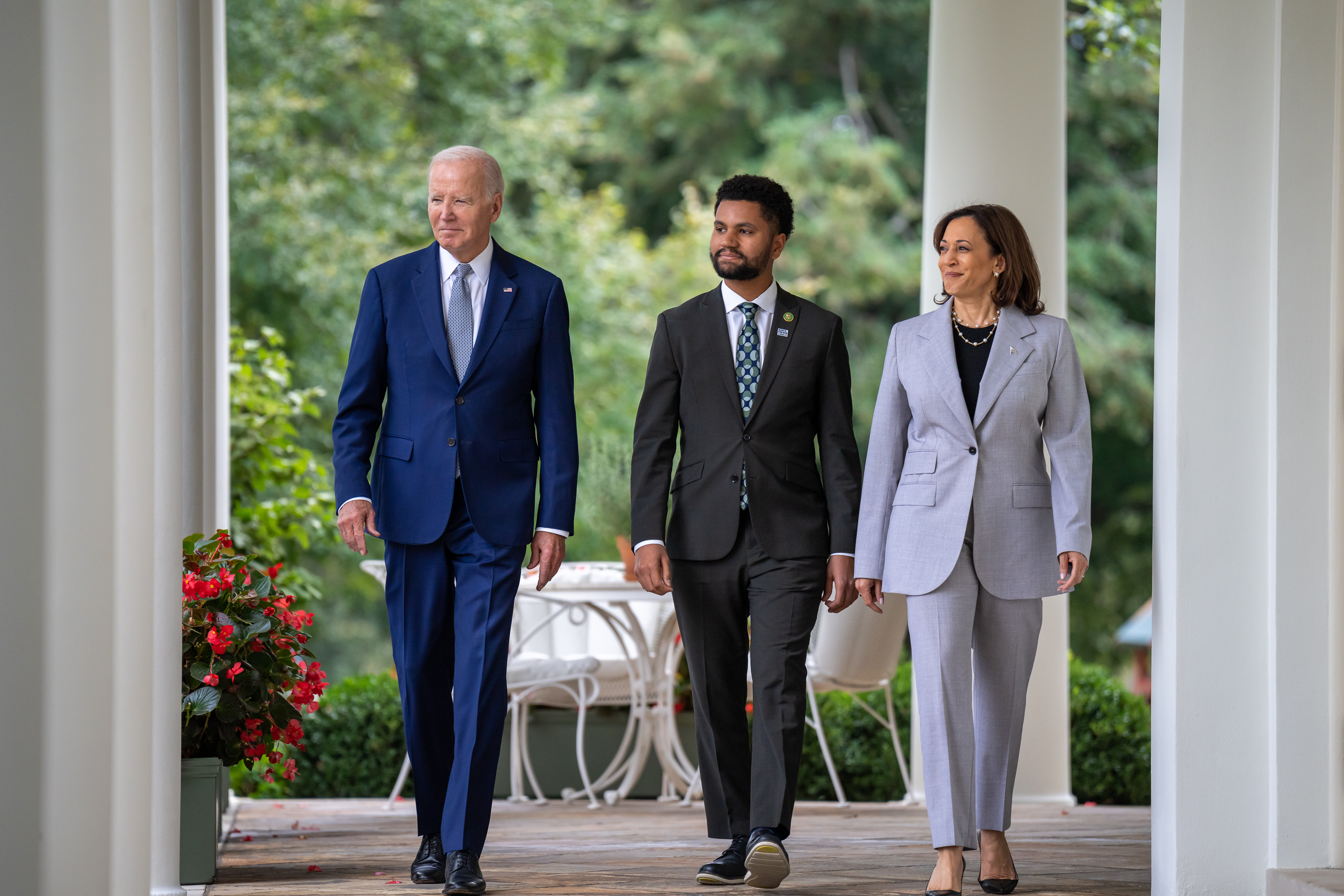
Frost, President Joe Biden, and Vice President Kamala Harris arrive to the Rose Garden for an announcement on the first-ever White House Office of Gun Violence Prevention in September 2023.

=== Criminal justice ===
Frost wants to "build toward a future without prison". He supports the decriminalization of sex work and the decriminalization of cannabis use.

=== Environment ===
Frost supports a Green New Deal. He has identified environmental justice as a priority of his campaign.

=== Gun policy ===
Frost is a strong advocate for gun control.

In January 2023, Frost and Representative Jared Moskowitz sent House speaker Kevin McCarthy a letter asking him to convene a classified meeting to address mass shootings. The letter called for the FBI and other law enforcement agencies to conduct the meeting.

=== Healthcare ===
Frost supports single-payer healthcare and investing in pandemic prevention. He introduced with Representative Doris Matsui in 2024 the EPIPEN Act, which seeks to cap out-of-pocket costs for epinephrine autoinjectors used for severe allergic reactions at $60 per two-pack for individuals with health insurance.

=== Housing ===
Frost is a proponent of affordable housing. He supported Kamala Harris's plan to build three million new housing units in her first term and believed that increasing housing affordability and accessibility should be a policy priority in a Harris administration. He was endorsed by the Florida chapter of YIMBY Action, a YIMBY group.

Frost co-sponsored the End Junk Fees for Renters Act in 2023, which aims to eliminate extra fees imposed by landlords, ban application fees, and increase transparency in rental agreements. In 2026, he introduced a bill that would help people that live in manufactured home communities purchase the parks where they live.

=== Foreign policy ===
==== Iran ====
Frost believes that the 2015 Iran nuclear deal (JCPOA) "certainly fell short in ways, but it blocked Iran's ability to build a nuclear weapon, which was an important success". In 2022, he supported restoration of the JCPOA but stressed "we must make it longer, stronger, and broader to cover not just the issue of nuclear weapons, but also the full range of destabilizing and threatening actions Iran engages in, like Iran's ballistic missile program and the country's support for terrorist proxies like Hezbollah and Hamas."

==== Israel–Palestine ====
Frost supports a two-state solution to the Israeli–Palestinian conflict. He has called himself both pro-Israel and pro-Palestinian. He has criticized the Palestinian Authority's Martyrs Fund that compensates the families of dead and wounded militants, likening it to a recruitment tactic of Hamas for the purpose of committing politically motivated violence against Israel. Frost opposes the Boycott, Divestment and Sanctions (BDS) movement and accuses it of harboring leadership from terrorist organizations.

Frost had formerly participated in pro-Palestine activism, signing pledges with the Florida Palestine Network (FPN) and the Palestinian Feminist Pledge, calling for support of the BDS movement, ending military aid to Israel, and rejecting the conflation of anti-Zionism with antisemitism. In early August 2022, the Jewish news website Jewish Insider published a candidate questionnaire from Frost's congressional campaign that showed a shift in Frost's foreign policy positions on Israel and Palestine. Jewish Insider characterized his responses as a reversal that distanced himself from his past while declaring an aggressive stance against the BDS movement, and stating his opposition to anti-Zionism. His campaign later released a position paper that formalized these positions.

During the course of the ongoing the Gaza war, Frost has shown a shift in his views on Israel–Palestine issues. While Frost voted to provide Israel with initial support following the October 7 attacks, as of April 2024 he has voted against providing Israel with further aid, has accused Israel of violating international law during the war, and has stated that "the bombing campaign in Gaza must stop".

In November 2025, Frost co-sponsored a resolution recognizing Israel's actions in Gaza as genocide.

=== Immigration ===
Frost is opposed to building a southern border wall. During a January 2024 House Committee on Oversight and Accountability hearing on immigration, Frost proposed removing the Statue of Liberty in response to the Republican bill H.R. 2, "Secure the Border Act". In March 2025, after former Columbia University student Mahmoud Khalil was detained by Immigration and Customs Enforcement (ICE) and his legal status was revoked, Frost remarked that his arrest should "scare everyone". In April 2025, Frost traveled to El Salvador with three other members of Congress to advocate for the release of Kilmar Abrego Garcia and others who had been deported without due process by the Trump administration.

Frost conducted multiple oversight visits to "Alligator Alcatraz", a temporary immigration detention center in the Florida Everglades, and publicly raised concerns about detention conditions and alleged human rights abuses. He continued calling for investigations and accountability after the facility's closure.

=== Technology ===
During his campaign, Frost announced a "crypto-advisory council" that would advise him during his campaign. He received $8,700 in contributions from crypto entrepreneur Sam Bankman-Fried and Sam's brother Gabriel, and he was among a handful of Democrats who received about $1 million in help from the super PAC Protect Our Future, almost all of it after announcing the council. In December 2022, the U.S. government indicted Bankman-Fried after alleging that he gave investor money to progressive political candidates, among other fraudulent crimes. After the announcement of charges against Bankman-Fried, Frost donated the individual donation to the Zebra Coalition, an LGBTQ charity.

Frost opposed the leveraged buyout of Electronic Arts.

== Personal life ==
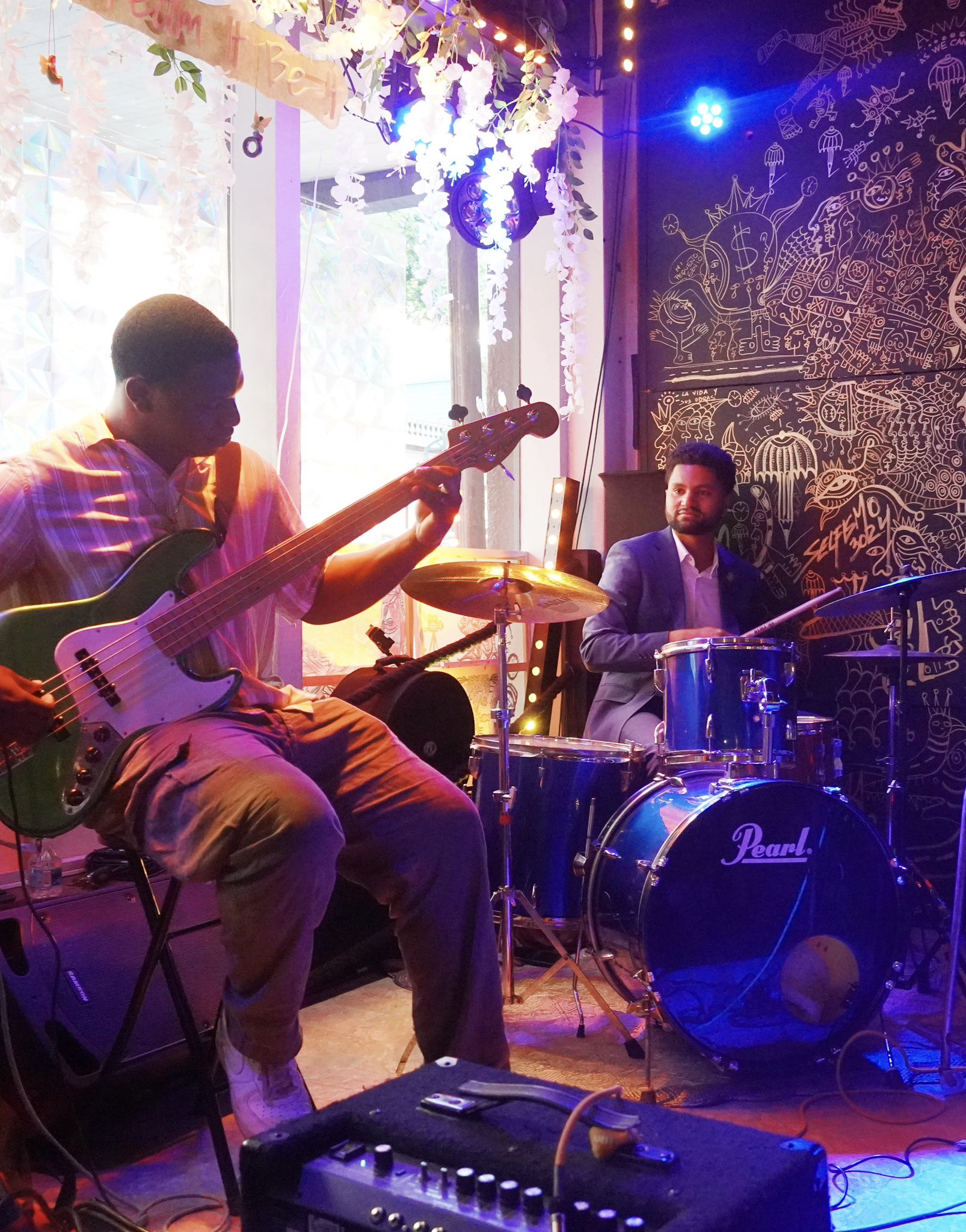
Frost plays drums at an event in support of the CREATE Art Act, 2024

Frost can speak both English and Spanish. He is a jazz drummer and plays the timbales. His nine-member high school band Seguro Que Sí (from Spanish 'of course') performed in the parade during President Obama's second inauguration in 2013. He also enjoys the trading-card game Yu-Gi-Oh!, having played the game since his younger years.

In December 2022, Frost said that he was denied a rental apartment in Washington, D.C., due to a "really bad" credit history. He explained that his credit rating was bad because he "ran up a lot of debt running for Congress for a year and a half".

On January 24, 2026, Frost stated that he was the victim of racial assault at Sundance Film Festival the day prior. According to Frost's account, a man told him that "Trump was going to deport [him]" before punching him in the face. Frost mentioned that he was not seriously injured. The police arrested a 28-year-old man for the alleged attack and charged him with aggravated burglary and assaulting an elected official. A judge ordered him held without bail.

== Electoral history ==
Electoral history of Maxwell Frost
Year	Office	Party	Primary			General			Result	Swing	Ref.
Year	Office	Party	Total	%	P.	Total	%	P.	Result	Swing	Ref.
2022	U.S. House	Democratic	19,288	34.77%	1st	117,955	59.00%	1st	Won	Hold	
2024	U.S. House	Democratic	33,208	81.77%	1st	181,455	62.37%	1st	Won	Hold	
2026	U.S. House	Democratic	Canceled			Unopposed			Won	Hold	
Source: Secretary of State of Florida | Election Results

== See also ==
- List of African-American United States representatives
- List of Hispanic and Latino Americans in the United States Congress

U.S. House of Representatives
Preceded by Val Demings	Member of the U.S. House of Representatives from Florida's 10th congressional district 2023–present	Incumbent
Honorary titles
Preceded by Madison Cawthorn	Baby of the House; 2023–present	Incumbent
U.S. order of precedence (ceremonial)
Preceded by Valerie Foushee	United States representatives by seniority 308th	Succeeded by Russell Fry
