= Justice Celebrezze =

Justice Celebrezze may refer to:

- Frank Celebrezze (1928–2010), chief justice of the Ohio Supreme Court
- Frank D. Celebrezze Jr. (born 1952), associate justice of the Ohio Supreme Court
- James Celebrezze (1938–2021), associate justice of the Ohio Supreme Court
