= Senator Celebrezze =

Senator Celebrezze may refer to:

- Anthony J. Celebrezze (1910–1998), Ohio State Senate
- Anthony J. Celebrezze Jr. (1941–2003), Ohio State Senate
- Frank Celebrezze (1928–2010), Ohio State Senate
