= Louis B. Seltzer =

American journalist

Louis Benson Seltzer
- Born: September 19, 1897; Cleveland, Ohio, U.S.
- Died: April 2, 1980 (aged 82); Spencer, Ohio
- Occupation: Journalist
- Employer: Cleveland Press

Louis Benson Seltzer (September 19, 1897 – April 2, 1980) was an American journalist who was editor-in-chief of the Cleveland Press, a now-defunct daily newspaper in Cleveland, Ohio, from 1928 until his retirement in 1966. As editor of the Press, Seltzer became one of the most powerful and most well-known citizens of Cleveland, earning the nickname "Mr. Cleveland". Under Seltzer's leadership, the Press gained the largest circulation of any newspaper in Ohio and cultivated a reputation as a "fighting paper" that "fought like hell for the people".

As editor of the Press, Seltzer emphasized the public service aspect of the paper and "vigorously developed the notion that his reporters were watchdogs for the public over political and governmental affairs". He also gained a reputation as a "kingmaker" for his successful sponsorship of numerous local politicians, including Cleveland mayors Anthony Celebrezze and Frank J. Lausche, who later became governor of Ohio and a United States Senator. Seltzer was the subject of both glowing praise and harsh criticism, particularly for his extensive coverage of the trial of Sam Sheppard.

== Early life and career ==
Seltzer was born on September 19, 1897, in Cleveland, Ohio, on the west bank of the Cuyahoga River. Seltzer's father, Charles Alden Seltzer, was "a frequently unemployed carpenter and a totally unsuccessful writer of romantic short stories". The family lived in poverty during Seltzer's early years; when Seltzer was 12 and in the sixth grade, he dropped out of school to work as an office boy at The Cleveland Leader. Although his father started to earn money as a writer about a year later, by then Seltzer was successful enough at his own job that he refused to quit and return to school.

At the age of 14, Seltzer met Marion Elizabeth Champlan, and the pair were married when they were both 18. Shortly after getting married, Seltzer moved to the Cleveland News to work as a reporter, but was fired shortly thereafter. After a short enlistment in the Army, Seltzer was hired by the Cleveland Press as a police reporter, and became a city editor in 1916. However, Seltzer felt he lacked the experience for the position and resigned after three months, switching to the role of political editor.

== Editorship of the Cleveland Press ==
Seltzer became editor of the Cleveland Press in 1928. During his editorship of the Press, Seltzer became one of the most well-known and most powerful people in the city, earning the nickname "Mr. Cleveland". Under his leadership the Press gained the largest circulation of any newspaper in Ohio, and cultivated a reputation as an advocate for its readers. Seltzer described the Press under his leadership as a "fighting paper" that "fought like hell for the people". During his editorship, Seltzer was the subject of "glowing" profiles in the national media, which emphasized his civic mindedness, his flamboyant public persona, and the freewheeling atmosphere of the Press newsroom. More recently, Seltzer has received both unfettered praise, and some criticism for his handling of certain stories, particularly the Sheppard trial.

=== Community involvement and advocacy ===
Seltzer emphasized the public service aspect of the Press and was personally involved in numerous civic and charitable endeavors. According to Seltzer's obituary in The Wall Street Journal, "With Mr. Seltzer at the helm, the Cleveland Press played an important part in bringing the city such things as downtown redevelopment, a municipal zoo, bridges, highways and parks along what was once a dilapidated Lake Erie waterfront".

=== "Kingmaker": Political activities ===
As editor of the Cleveland Press, "Seltzer vigorously developed the notion that his reporters were watchdogs for the public over political and governmental affairs". According to a 1950 profile of him in LIFE magazine, "No crook in public office has slept well in Louis Seltzer's regime, although many a crook in private pursuits has doubtless slept like a baby". According to later writer James Neff, "When local government did not function, the Press struck with editorial might, even if it meant using a sledgehammer to crush a gnat. Overkill could be rationalized because the cause was just, for the little guy. Anyone who tried to play outside these rules or who was perceived as looking down on his mostly blue-collar readers, Seltzer enjoyed taking down a peg".

Seltzer also gained a reputation as a "kingmaker" for his use of the paper's influence to help the careers of numerous local politicians, including "Frank J. Lausche, who served as mayor of Cleveland, governor of Ohio and a U.S. senator, Cleveland mayor Anthony Celebrezze, Thomas A. Burke, also mayor and then a U.S. senator, and Supreme Court Justice Harold H. Burton". According to a 1950 LIFE profile of Seltzer, "No civic campaign can get off the ground without his support, although no worthy cause... ever lacks it. For more than a decade nobody has been elected mayor or carried Cuyahoga County for governor without the backing of the Press".

=== Coverage of Sheppard murder ===
In July 1954, when Sam Sheppard, a Bay Village doctor, was accused of murdering his wife, the Cleveland Press published a series of front-page editorials, some written by Seltzer himself, alleging Sheppard's guilt and pushing for swift, punitive action from the local authorities. The stream of editorials began with the July 20 article "Somebody Is Getting Away With Murder", written by Seltzer himself. The following day, the Press published another front-page editorial, addressed directly to County Coroner Sam Gerber: "Why No Inquest? Do It Now, Dr. Gerber". A few hours after the editorial was published, Gerber ordered an inquest. And on July 30, the Press published an editorial entitled "Quit Stalling – Bring Him In". Sheppard was arrested on a murder charge that evening.

Seltzer and the Press later received harsh criticism for their handling of the case. Federal district judge Carl A. Weinmann, in his 1964 ruling that Sheppard did not receive a fair trial, partially blamed the media, particularly the Press: "If ever there was a trial by newspaper, this is a perfect example. And the most insidious example was the Cleveland Press. For some reason that newspaper took upon itself the role of accuser, judge and jury". The United States Supreme Court ruled on June 6, 1966, in Sheppard v. Maxwell that Sheppard did not receive a fair trial because of the negative publicity he received in the press. F. Lee Bailey, one of Sheppard's lawyers, later wrote that "Seltzer used his newspaper like a club, ordering politicians around like minions and intimidating everyone who disagreed with him. If Seltzer was roused, he would spread a personally penned editorial across eight columns of his newspaper, seeking to grind some unfortunate dissident under his heel".

Seltzer defended the Cleveland Press and his own personal involvement in the case in his 1956 memoir The Years Were Good. Seltzer argued that he was convinced the Sheppard family was involved in a conspiracy to get away with murder and that he personally wrote the editorials, instead of passing them off to one of his employees, out of concern for the safety of his staff.

== Later life and death ==
Seltzer published his memoir, The Years Were Good, in 1956. The memoir, which Seltzer published himself, is written in the "rags to riches" mold of Horatio Alger in that it emphasizes Seltzer's rise from relative poverty to professional success via persistent hard work.

After retiring as editor of the Press in 1966, Seltzer occasionally wrote columns for suburban newspapers and also published a collection of character sketches, Six and God (1966). He continued to associate with more than 50 organizations and was on the Pulitzer Prize Advisory Board from 1956 to 1968. When Seltzer's wife died in 1965 he moved in with his daughter, Shirley Cooper, in Rocky River, Ohio. When Cooper and her husband moved to Spencer in Medina County in 1973, Seltzer moved with them. Seltzer died in his daughter's house on April 2, 1980, at the age of 82. Seltzer's living relatives at the time of his death included his daughter, two siblings, four grandchildren and one great-grandchild. His son, Chester E. Seltzer, who was also a journalist and writer, had died in 1971.
