= Brian O'Connell =

Brian O'Connell or Bryan O'Connell may refer to:

- Brian O'Connell (advocate) (1930–2011), American author, academic, and public administrator
- Brian O'Connell (musician) (born 1963), American instrumentalist and composer
- Brian O'Connell (hurler) (born 1984), Irish hurler
- Bryan O'Connell, musician in Si Schroeder's band

== See also ==
- Brian Connell (born 1956), New Zealand politician
