= Charles Alden Seltzer =

American writer (1875–1942)

- Born: August 15, 1875; Janesville, Wisconsin
- Died: February 9, 1942 (aged 66); Cleveland, Ohio
- Resting place: Sunset Memorial Park, North Olmsted, Ohio
- Occupations: Writer, politician
- Relatives: Louis B. Seltzer (son)
- Writing career
- Genres: Western novels, screenplays

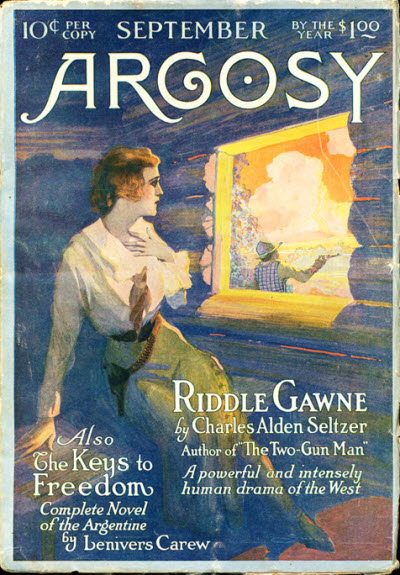
Seltzer's novel Riddle Gawne was serialized in The Argosy in 1917

Charles Alden Seltzer (August 15, 1875 – February 9, 1942) was an American writer. He was a prolific author of western novels, had writing credits for more than a dozen film titles, and authored numerous stories published in magazines, most prominently in Argosy.

== Life ==
Seltzer was born in Janesville, Wisconsin, the son of Lucien B. Seltzer and Oceania Hart of Columbus, Ohio. Before becoming a successful writer, he was variously a newsboy, telegraph messenger, painter, carpenter and manager of the circulation of a newspaper, building inspector, editor of a small newspaper, and an appraiser.

He married Ella Seltzer, and they had three sons and two daughters. His son, Louis B. Seltzer, later editor of the Cleveland Press, recalled that the family was quite poor when his father was struggling to break into the writing profession (he wrote two hundred stories before receiving an acceptance). During this time, Seltzer's wife brought him wrapping paper from the butcher to write on.

In addition to Argosy, Seltzer's work also appeared in Adventure, Short Stories, Blue Book, The Outing Magazine, Western Story Magazine and the US edition of Pearson's Magazine.

Seltzer wrote his westerns from the experience of five years living in New Mexico. Towards the end of his life, he was also elected mayor of North Olmsted, Ohio, a Cleveland suburb, from 1930 to 1935.

== Works ==
- The Council of Three (1900) – first book
- The Range Riders (1911)
- The Two-Gun Man (1911)
- The Triangle Cupid (1912)
- The Coming of the Law (1912)
- The Boss of the Lazy Y (1915)
- The Range Boss (1916)
- The Vengeance of Jefferson Gawne (1917)
- “Firebrand” Trevison (1918)
- The Ranchman (1919)
- The Trail to Yesterday (1919)
- The Trail Horde (1920)
- Beau Rand (1921)
- “Drag” Harlan (1921)
- West! (1922)
- Square Deal Sanderson (1922)
- The Way of the Buffalo (1924)
- Last Hope Ranch (1925)
- Trailing Back (1925)
- Channing Comes Through (1925)
- "Slow" Burgess (1926)
- Pedro the Magnificent (1926)
- Land of the Free (1927)
- The Mesa (1928)
- Mystery Range (1928)
- Brass Commandments (1928)
- The Valley of the Stars (1928)
- The Gentleman from Virginia (1928)
- The Red Brand (1929)
- The Raider (1929)
- Gone North (1930)
- A Son of Arizona (1931)
- Double Cross Ranch (1932)
- War On Wishbone Range (1932)
- Lonesome Ranch (1933)
- Clear the Trail (1933)
- West of Apache Pass (1934)
- Silver Spurs (1935)
- Kingdom in the Cactus (1936)
- Parade of the Empty Boots (1937)
- Treasure Ranch (1940)
- Arizona Jim (1942)
- So Long, Sucker (1943)
