= Literations =

American nonprofit organization

- Founded: 1991
- Type: Nonprofit
- Purpose: youth literacy, intergenerational mentoring, social-emotional learning
- Headquarters: Boston, Massachusetts
- Location: Boston, Massachusetts
- Website: www.literations.org
- Formerly called: Generations Incorporated

Literations (formerly Generations Incorporated), founded in 1991, is a non-profit organization based in Boston, Massachusetts. As of 2009, the organization ran one of the largest programs in the United States employing volunteer adults over 55 years of age to tutor children in literacy skills, in affiliation with the AARP program Experience Corps.
