= Bankman =

Bankman is a surname. Notable people with the surname include:

- Joseph Bankman (born 1955), American lawyer and professor
- Sam Bankman-Fried (born 1992), American cryptocurrency entrepreneur and criminal
