= 1949 Cleveland mayoral election =

Cleveland mayoral election, 1949
- November 8, 1949
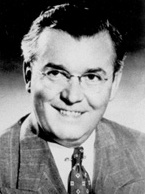

Nominee	Thomas A. Burke	Franklin Polk
Party	Democratic	Republican
Popular vote	158,115	77,921
Percentage	66.99%	33.01%
Mayor before election
Thomas A. Burke
Democratic
Elected mayor
Thomas A. Burke
Democratic

The Cleveland mayoral election of 1949 saw the reelection of Thomas A. Burke to a third consecutive term.

== General election ==
1949 Cleveland mayoral election (general election)
Party	Candidate	Votes	%
Democratic	Thomas A. Burke (incumbent)	158,115	66.99%
Republican	Franklin Polk	77,921	33.01%
Turnout		236,036	
