= Brian O'Connell (advocate) =

American author (1930-2011)

- Born: January 23, 1930; Worcester, Massachusetts
- Died: March 21, 2011 (aged 81); Chatham, Massachusetts
- Education: Tufts University
- Occupation: CEO
- Employer: Independent Sector
- Known for: Co-founding Independent Sector, helped found Civicus: World Alliance for Civic Participation, helped found the Jonathan M. Tisch College of Citizenship and Public Service at Tufts University
- Spouse: Ann Brown O'Connell
- Children: Todd O'Connell, Tracey O'Connell Sperry, Matthew O'Connell

Brian O'Connell (23 January 1930 – 21 March 2011) was an American author, academic, and public administrator who helped found Independent Sector, an organization that represents the interests of charities, foundations and nonprofit giving programs in the United States.

In 1980, O’Connell joined John W. Gardner, the Secretary of Health, Education and Welfare in the Johnson administration and the founder of Common Cause, to create Independent Sector, which now (2012) has 550 member nonprofit organizations. O’Connell and Gardner, who died in 2002, saw the need for an umbrella organization that could speak for all charities and other nonprofit groups and represent their interests in Washington.

== Biography ==
=== Early life and education ===
Brian O’Connell was born on Jan. 23, 1930, in Worcester, Mass. After earning a bachelor's degree from Tufts University in 1953 he did graduate work in public administration at the Maxwell School at Syracuse University.

=== Career ===
He went to work for the American Heart Association as a field representative, then became director of its operations in Maryland and California.

In 1966 he was named the executive director of the National Mental Health Association (now Mental Health America), where he was a leader in promoting new ideas about community care and educating the public about new research on depression. He also helped organize the National Committee on Patients’ Rights.

After leaving the association in 1978 he became the president of the National Council on Philanthropy and the executive director of the Coalition of National Voluntary Organizations.

While at Independent Sector, he helped found Civicus: World Alliance for Civic Participation.

After retiring from Independent Sector he spent the next decade as a professor of citizenship and public service at Tufts. He helped found the Jonathan M. Tisch College of Citizenship and Public Service at Tufts, where he established the Brian O'Connell Library.

=== Public service ===
He was a trustee of Tufts University and a board member of Tisch College.

He also served on the boards of The Bridgespan Group, The Cape Cod Foundation, Ewing Marion Kauffman Foundation, the National Academy of Public Administration, Points of Light Foundation, Ima Hogg Foundation, and the National Assembly of Health and Social Welfare Organizations (now National Human Services Assembly). He was also chairman of the 1989 Salzburg Seminar on non-governmental organizations.

=== Honors and death ===
He was an elected Fellow of the American Public Health Association and the National Academy of Public Administration and received several honorary degrees, including a doctorate of humanities from Fairleigh Dickinson University and doctorate of laws from Indiana University.

He won a number of awards including a special John W. Gardner Leadership Award when he retired from Independent Sector; Weston Howland Award for Citizenship from the Lincoln Filene Center; Gold Key Award of the American Society of Association Executives; United Way of America's Award for Professionalism; the Chairman's Award of the National Society of Fund Raising Executives, the Tufts Presidential medal, and with John W. Gardner, the 1998 Tiffany Award for Public Service.

O'Connell died in 2011 in Chatham Mass. where he had lived since retiring from Independent Sector.

== Work ==
=== Books ===
- America's Voluntary Spirit: A Book of Readings, Foundation Center, 1983, (ISBN 978-0879540814)
- The Board Member's Book: Making A Difference In Voluntary Organizations, Foundation Center, 1985, (ISBN 978-0879541330)
- Philanthropy In Action, Foundation Center, 1987, (ISBN 978-0879542306)
- Volunteers in Action, Foundation Center, 1989, (ISBN 978-0879542917)
- People Power: Service, Advocacy, Empowerment : Selected Writings of Brian O'Connell, Foundation Center, 1994, (ISBN 978-0879545635)
- Board Overboard: Laughs And Lessons For All But The Perfect Nonprofit, Jossey Bass, 1995, (ISBN 978-0787901790)
- Powered By Coalition: The Story Of Independent Sector, Jossey Bass, 1998, (ISBN 978-0787909543)
- Voices From The Heart: In Celebration Of America's Volunteers, Chronicle Books, 1998, (ISBN 978-0811821155)
- Civil Society: The Underpinnings Of American Democracy, Tufts University Press, 1999, (ISBN 978-0874519242)
- Fifty Years In Public Causes: Stories From A Road Less Traveled, Tufts University Press, 2005, (ISBN 978-1584654766)

=== Papers ===
- The Right to Know, MH, 59, 2, 11–3, Spr 75
- The Independent Sector: Uniquely American, New Directions for Experiential Learning, (New Partnerships: Higher Education and the Nonprofit Sector) n18 p17-24 Dec 1982
- Citizenship and Community Service: Are They a Concern and Responsibility of Higher Education?, Paper presented at the National Conference of the American Association of Higher Education (Chicago, IL, March 17, 1985)
- Strengthening Philanthropy and Voluntary Action, National Civic Review, 1987, (doi:10.1002/ncr.4100760405)
- Budgeting and financial accountability (Nonprofit Management Series), Independent Sector, 1988
- Finding, developing, and rewarding good board members (Nonprofit Management Series), Independent Sector, 1988
- Recruiting, encouraging, and evaluating the chief staff officer (Nonprofit Management Series), Independent Sector, 1988
- The role of the board and board members (Nonprofit Management Series), Independent Sector, 1988
- Operating effective committees (Nonprofit Management Series), Independent Sector, 1988
- Evaluating results (Nonprofit Management Series), Independent Sector, 1988
- Conducting good meetings (Nonprofit Management Series), Independent Sector, 1988
- The roles and relationships of the chief volunteer and chief staff officers, board, and staff: who does what? (Nonprofit Management Series), Independent Sector, 1988
- Fund Raising (Nonprofit Management Series), Independent Sector, 1988
- What Voluntary Activity Can and Cannot Do for America, Public Administration Review, v49 n5 p486-91 Sep-Oct 1989
- Impact of nonprofits on civil society, National Civic Review, 1995, (doi:10.1002/ncr.4100840207)
- A Major Transfer of Government Responsibility to Voluntary Organizations? Proceed with Caution, Public Administration Review; Vol. 56; pp. 222–225, 1996 (doi:10.2307/976444)
- Civil Society: Definitions and Descriptions, Nonprofit and Voluntary Sector Quarterly, September 2000; vol. 29, 3: pp. 471–478 (doi:10.1177/0899764000293007)
- Valuing Free Association, ASSOCIATIONS NOW, December 2006
