= 1951 Cleveland mayoral election =

Cleveland mayoral election, 1951
- November 8, 1951
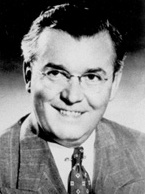

Nominee	Thomas A. Burke	William J. McDermott
Party	Democratic	Republican
Popular vote	114,198	92,520
Percentage	55.24%	44.76%
Mayor before election
Thomas A. Burke
Democratic
Elected mayor
Thomas A. Burke
Democratic

The Cleveland mayoral election of 1951 saw the reelection of Thomas A. Burke to a fourth consecutive term.

== General election ==
1951 Cleveland mayoral election (general election)
Party	Candidate	Votes	%
Democratic	Thomas A. Burke (incumbent)	114,198	55.24%
Republican	Franklin Polk	92,520	44.76%
Turnout		206,718	
