= Joseph Bankman =

American legal scholar and psychologist (born 1955)

- Born: Allan Joseph Bankman; 1955 (age 70–71)
- Partner: Barbara Fried
- Children: 2, including Sam

Academic background
- Education: University of California, Berkeley (BA); Yale University (JD); Palo Alto University (PsyD)

Academic work
- Discipline: Law
- Sub-discipline: Tax law
- Institutions: USC Gould School of Law; University of California, Santa Cruz; Stanford Law School

Allan Joseph Bankman (born 1955) is an American legal scholar and psychologist. He is the Ralph M. Parsons Professor of Law and Business at Stanford Law School. He was also employed at FTX, the cryptocurrency company founded by his son, Sam Bankman-Fried, who is an entrepreneur and convicted felon. His tenure at FTX lasted until the company's bankruptcy and subsequent collapse in 2022.

== Education ==
Bankman earned a Bachelor of Arts degree from the University of California, Berkeley in 1977 and a Juris Doctor degree from Yale Law School in 1980. He later earned a doctorate in clinical psychology from Palo Alto University.

== Career ==
Bankman is a scholar in the discipline of tax law and is a compiler of two tax casebooks, including Federal Income Taxation.

Early in his career, he taught at the USC Gould School of Law and practiced with the Los Angeles firm of Tuttle & Taylor. In 1989, he joined the faculty at Stanford Law School.

Later in his career, he returned to being a student and earned an additional degree in clinical psychology from Palo Alto University, interning with the Counseling and Psychological Services (CAPS) of the University of California, Santa Cruz. He worked as a counselor for first-year law students on handling the anxiety of law school. Bankman also hosted a podcast called WellnessCast for Stanford Law School to discuss "wellness and mental health within the legal profession."

In 2004, he and his colleagues developed a proposal for a California program called ReadyReturn, whereby citizens' income tax returns were filled out in advance, requiring only that the users make corrections. The program failed to pass the California legislature by one vote, reportedly after lobbying efforts from tax software preparation company Intuit. Bankman spent an estimated $30,000 to $35,000 of his own money on the fight against Intuit.

Following the defeat in California, he continued to advocate for simplification of the U.S. tax filing system and the adoption of return-free filing.

In 2016, he lent his support to Senator Elizabeth Warren's Tax Filing Simplification Act along with 50 other law professors and economists. A letter with Bankman as the lead signatory states, "Much of the time and expense involved in tax filing is unnecessary." He was said to be involved with writing Senator Warren's bill.

He served as a co-host of the Stanford Legal podcast along with fellow professor Pamela Karlan.

== Personal life ==
Bankman's partner is Stanford Law School professor emeritus Barbara Fried (sister of Linda P. Fried), whom he met in 1988 while teaching at Stanford. The couple did not marry because they felt it was unfair to gay couples who could not legally marry. They have two sons, Sam Bankman-Fried and Gabe Bankman-Fried. Bankman and his partner live in Stanford, California.

=== FTX ===
In 2021, Bankman took a leave of absence from Stanford Law to work full time at FTX.

Bankman's son, Sam Bankman-Fried, was convicted of seven felony counts—conspiracy to commit wire fraud, conspiracy to commit commodities fraud, conspiracy to commit securities fraud, conspiracy to commit money laundering, and conspiracy to defraud the Federal Election Commission and commit campaign finance violations—after serving as the founder and former CEO of the FTX cryptocurrency exchange, which collapsed amid allegations of fraud in November 2022. Joseph Bankman was a paid part-time employee of FTX prior to its bankruptcy. He worked for the company for 11 months and focused much of his work on charitable operations. In 2017, he interviewed and hired the first lawyers employed by Alameda Research, his son's cryptocurrency trading firm. He reportedly also served as the first attorney for FTX when the exchange was in its nascent stages. He also raised funds for the firm before its bankruptcy; via a connection to his former Stanford Law School student Orlando Bravo, Bankman made an introduction which led to a $125 million investment in FTX from private equity firm Thoma Bravo in June 2021.

Bankman arrived in the Bahamas as FTX entered bankruptcy. In early November, he called Anthony Scaramucci on behalf of FTX to ask if Scaramucci and SkyBridge Capital could help the company raise billions of dollars to meet customer redemptions. After his son's indictment, Joseph Bankman came under scrutiny for his part in the business. Bankman and Fried were sued by the team overseeing the FTX bankruptcy in September 2023. The lawsuit alleged they unjustly enriched themselves, receiving a $10 million cash gift and a $16.4 million beachfront property in The Bahamas.
