= Gabriel Bankman-Fried =

American lobbyist

Gabriel Bankman-Fried is an American lobbyist and former Wall Street trader and the former director of the non-profit Guarding Against Pandemics and its associated political action committee. He is the brother of Sam Bankman-Fried.

== Early life and education ==
Bankman-Fried's parents are Barbara Fried and Joseph Bankman, both professors at Stanford Law School. His maternal grandmother, Adrienne Fried Block, was a noted musicologist. His maternal grandfather, George Fried, was an administrator with the New York State Supreme Court probation department.

His aunt Linda P. Fried was the dean of Columbia University Mailman School of Public Health.

Bankman-Fried graduated from Brown University in 2017.

== Career ==
After graduating, Bankman-Fried went to work at Jane Street Capital.

In 2020, Bankman-Fried founded and ran Guarding Against Pandemics, a pandemic-prevention advocacy group and political action committee. The organization was heavily financed by his brother, who gave the organization tens of millions of dollars. The organization worked closely with Protect Our Future, a super PAC run by Democratic operatives.

After the Bankruptcy of FTX in November 2022, Bankman-Fried resigned from Guarding Against Pandemics.

In July 2023, allegations emerged that Bankman-Fried and his brother Sam considered purchasing the island of Nauru to use as a bunker in the event of an apocalyptic event, in what has been described as a “misguided and sometimes dystopian” project.
