= Independent Sector =

American philanthropic coalition

- Founded: October 18, 1976; 49 years ago
- Merger of: Coalition of National Voluntary Organizations; National Council of Philanthropy
- Tax ID no.: 52-1081024
- Legal status: 501(c)(3) nonprofit organization
- Headquarters: Washington, D.C., United States
- Coordinates: 38.9034291°N 77.0372580°W
- Services: National conference, public policy, and networking and member engagement.
- Chair: Stephen B. Heinz
- Chair, Director: Neil Nicoll
- President, CEO: Akilah Watkins (Jan 2023-present)
- Subsidiaries: 1620 IS LLC
- Revenue: $8,703,247 (2014)
- Expenses: $8,774,204 (2014)
- Endowment: $4,521,437
- Employees: 53 (2014)
- Volunteers: 275 (2014)
- Website: www.independentsector.org

Independent Sector is a US coalition of nonprofit organizations, foundations and corporate giving programs in the United States. Founded in 1980, it is the first organization to combine the grant seekers and grantees.

Located in Washington, D.C., Independent Sector largely works on federal policy issues that affect the nonprofit and philanthropic sector, including tax incentives and exemption status of organizations within the sector.

Several other organizational goals include cultivating leaders and emerging leaders, supporting and enhancing organizational effectiveness and ethical practices, and being the vital voice of the sector.

== History ==
Independent Sector was created in 1980 with the merger of two nonprofit associations: the National Council of Philanthropy and the Coalition of National Voluntary Organizations. The charter meeting was held in Washington, D.C., on March 5, 1980. Brian O'Connell was the first president and John W. Gardner was the first Governing Board Chair.

== Leadership ==
Akilah Watkins is the president and CEO of Independent Sector as of January 2023. Since its founding in 1980, Independent Sector has had the following board chairs:

| Name | Term |
|---|---|
| John W. Gardner, co-founder of Independent Sector | 1980–1983 |
| Richard W. Lyman | 1984–1986 |
| John H. Filer | 1987–1989 |
| Eugene C. Dorsey | 1990–1992 |
| Raul Yzaguirre | 1993–1995 |
| Barbara Finberg | 1996–1998 |
| Peter B. Goldberg | 1999–2001 |
| John R. Seffrin | 2002–2004 |
| William Trueheart | 2005–2007 |
| Brian Gallagher | 2008–2010 |
| Stephen B. Heintz | 2011–2013 |
| Jeffrey Bradach | 2013–2021 |
| Fred Blackwell | 2021–present |
