= Barbara Fried =

American lawyer and professor

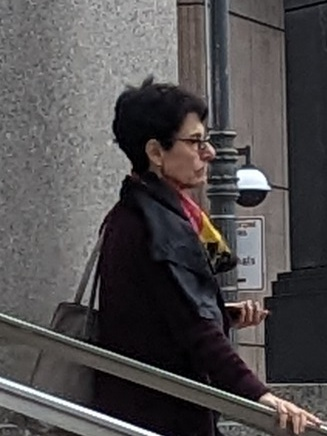
- Fried in 2023
- Born: 1951 (age 74–75)
- Partner: Joseph Bankman
- Children: Sam Bankman-Fried; Gabe Bankman-Fried
- Relatives: Linda P. Fried (sister)

Academic background
- Education: Harvard University (BA, MA, JD)

Academic work
- Discipline: Law
- Institutions: Stanford Law School
- Main interests: Legal ethics
- Notable works: "What Does Matter? The Case for Killing the Trolley Problem (Or Letting It Die)" (2012)

Barbara Helen Fried (/friːd/; born 1951) is an American lawyer and professor emerita at Stanford Law School. Fried and Joseph Bankman are the parents of FTX and Alameda Research co-founder Sam Bankman-Fried, convicted on seven counts of criminal fraud as CEO of the now-defunct and bankrupt cryptocurrency exchange, alongside other company insiders.

== Education ==
She graduated from Harvard College with a B.A. degree magna cum laude in English and American literature in 1977 and an M.A. degree in literature in 1980, as well as a J.D. degree magna cum laude in 1983 from Harvard Law School. Fried served from 1983 to 1984 as a judicial law clerk for Judge J. Edward Lumbard of the United States Court of Appeals for the Second Circuit.

== Career ==
Fried joined the Stanford Law School Faculty as a tenure-track professor in 1987 after working as an associate attorney at the law firm Paul, Weiss, Rifkind, Wharton & Garrison from 1984 to 1987. She has investigated such topics as contractualism, libertarianism, and utilitarianism, and is considered an expert on legal ethics. Fried has written about effective altruism and moral philosopher Peter Singer. She has offered critiques on philosopher Robert Nozick's theory of property and psychologist John Money's work on "fetally androgenized girls." Her academic work centers on a branch of ethics known as consequentialism, the view that whether an action is right or wrong is determined by its consequences.

Fried is an affiliate of the Stanford Center on Poverty & Inequality.

Fried retired from teaching in late 2022, which she said was a "long-planned" decision.

== Activism ==
Fried is a co-founder of the political fundraising organization Mind the Gap, which advocates support for Democratic Party candidates and funds get-out-the-vote groups. The organization, described by Vox in January 2020 as "Silicon Valley's secretive donor group", advises high-profile tech donors, including former Google CEO Eric Schmidt and LinkedIn co-founder Reid Hoffman, on where to direct campaign contributions.

In November 2022, Fried resigned from her chairwoman position with Mind the Gap.

== Personal life ==
Fried is Jewish.

Fried's partner is Stanford Law School professor Joseph Bankman, whom she met in 1988 while teaching at Stanford. The couple did not marry because they felt it was unfair to gay couples who could not legally marry.

She is the mother of Sam Bankman-Fried, the convicted founder and former CEO of now-bankrupt crypto exchange FTX, and his younger brother, Gabe. Fried's sister Linda P. Fried is the Dean of Columbia University's Mailman School of Public Health.

Fried and Joseph Bankman were sued by the team overseeing the FTX bankruptcy in September 2023. The lawsuit alleges they unjustly enriched themselves, receiving a $10 million cash gift and a $16.4 million beachfront property in The Bahamas.

== Works ==
=== Academic work ===
- The Progressive Assault on Laissez Faire: Robert Hale and the First Law and Economics Movement (2001)
- "Left-Libertarianism, Once More: a Rejoinder to Vallentyne, Steiner and Otsuka" (2005)
- Can Contractualism Save Us from Aggregation? (2012)
- "The Holmesian Bad Man Flubs His Entrance" (2012)
- "What Does Matter? The Case for Killing the Trolley Problem (Or Letting It Die)" (2012)
- "Beyond Blame" (2013)
- "But Seriously, Folks, What Do People Really Want?" (2013)
- "Emotional Empathy Is Not the Culprit" (2014)
- "Brief of Interested Law Professors as Amici Curiae Supporting Respondent in Direct Marketing Association v. Brohl" (2014)
- "Facing Up To Risk" (2019)
- "Anxiety Psychoeducation for Law Students: A Pilot Program" (2019)
- Facing Up to Scarcity: The Logic and Limits of Nonconsequentialist Thought (2020)

=== Short stories ===
- "A Note to A. A. Milne (on the occasion of my mother's 88th birthday)"
- "The Days are Gods"
- "Really" Word Riot
- "House of Pies" (2011, semi-finalist in New Millennium Writings' 2011 Fiction contest)
- "Song of Longing" and "Elegy for Daniel" (2012)
- "The Half-Life of Nat Glickstein" (2013), Subtropics, Issue 15 (2013 Winter),
- "It Goes Without Saying" (2013) Bellevue Literary Review (Spring 2013, finalist in BLR's 2013 Fiction contest; nominated for Pushcart Prize)
- "A Betting Man" (2014, top 25 in Glimmertrain's 2014 Very Short Fiction contest; long listed in Fish Publishing's 2014-15 Short Story Contest)
- "The History of Ideas" (2014)
- "What Makes That a Joke?" (2014)
- "After Henry" (2017)
- "What Remains" (2017, Winner of Fish Publishing's 2017 International Short Memoir Contest)
