= Robert E. Leach =

American judge

Chief Justice of the Ohio Supreme Court
- In office August 21, 1978 – December 10, 1978
- Appointed by: Jim Rhodes
- Preceded by: C. William O'Neill
- Succeeded by: Frank Celebrezze

Associate Justice of the Ohio Supreme Court
- In office September 25, 1970 – December 8, 1972
- Appointed by: Jim Rhodes
- Preceded by: John M. Matthias
- Succeeded by: Frank Celebrezze

Personal details
- Born: December 18, 1911 Columbus, Ohio
- Died: November 21, 1993 (aged 81) Columbus, Ohio
- Resting place: Union Cemetery, Columbus
- Party: Republican
- Spouse: Marie E. Chumbley
- Education: Ohio State University College of Law

Robert E. Leach (December 18, 1911 – November 21, 1993) was a Republican judge in the U.S. State of Ohio who sat as Chief Justice of the Ohio Supreme Court in 1978.

== Biography ==
Robert E. Leach was born December 18, 1911, to Charles A. and Hazel K. Leach, and earned bachelors and law degrees from the Ohio State University and its Law School. He was Delta Theta Phi, and was the first editor of the Ohio State Law Journal, 1934–1935.

Leach entered into private practice of law in Columbus, until 1942, when he entered the U.S. Army, serving with the military police and in overseas service as special agent of the Counter Intelligence Corps, until 1946.

After the war, Leach served as assistant city attorney. In 1951 he became chief counsel for Ohio Attorney General C. William O'Neill.

In 1954, Leach won a two-year short term on the Franklin County Court of Common Pleas, and was re-elected to two six year full terms, serving until 1968. In 1969, Ohio Governor Jim Rhodes appointed him to the 10th District Court of Appeals.

On September 25, 1970, John M. Matthias resigned from the Ohio Supreme Court, and Governor Rhodes named Leach as his replacement. He had to run for election for the remainder of Matthias's term in November 1972, and lost to Democrat Frank Celebrezze. Celebrezze's election was certified and he took office December 8, 1972.

Leach returned to private practice in 1973 in Columbus with Vorys, Sater, Seymour and Pease. On August 20, 1978, Chief Justice of the Ohio Supreme Court C. William O'Neill died. Rhodes again appointed Leach, and he chose not to run for the remainder of the term in November of that year, believing he was not up to the rigors of a statewide campaign. Celebrezze won election, and was seated December 10, 1978, ending Leach's service.

Leach married Marie E. Chumbley on November 29, 1940. They had no children. Leach died in Columbus, November 21, 1993, and is interred in Union Cemetery.
