= 1945 Cleveland mayoral election =

Cleveland mayoral election, 1945
- November 6, 1945
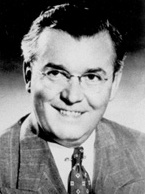

Nominee	Thomas A. Burke	Ray C. Miller
Party	Democratic	Republican
Popular vote	125,596	59,707
Percentage	67.78%	32.22%
Mayor before election
Democratic
Elected mayor
Thomas A. Burke
Democratic

The Cleveland mayoral election of 1945 saw the election of Thomas A. Burke.

== General election ==
1945 Cleveland mayoral election (general election)
Party	Candidate	Votes	%
Democratic	Thomas A. Burke	125,596	67.78%
Republican	Ray C. Miller	59,707	32.22%
Turnout		185,303	
