= Things Remembered =

E-commerce retailer

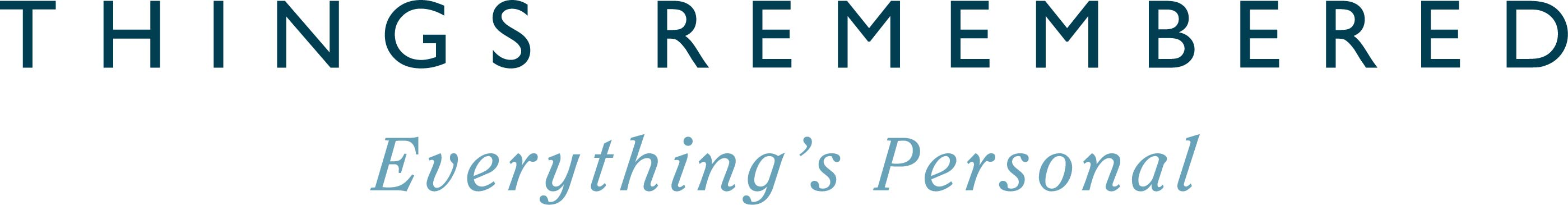
- Type: Private
- Industry: Retail
- Founded: 1967; 59 years ago
- Founder: Joseph Edmund Cole
- Headquarters: Highland Heights, Ohio, U.S.
- Key people: Chris McCann, CEO
- Parent: 1-800-Flowers (2023–present)
- Website: www.thingsremembered.com

Things Remembered is an e-commerce retailer specializing in personalized gifts, messaging and engraving.

== History ==
Things Remembered was founded as "Can Do" in 1967 as a subsidiary of Cole National Corporation by Joseph Edmund Cole. At the time Cole National consisted of Cole Vision, DBA Sears Optical, Montgomery Ward Vision, Cole Key Company, and several other subsidiaries. Cole National was taken private in 1984 by Kohlberg Kravis Roberts. The Cole family reclaimed the company in 1987 through a leveraged buyout. The company prospered through much of the 1980s.

Sales began to slump and in 1990 Cole National unloaded unprofitable business units leaving Cole Key, Cole Vision and Things Remembered. The company went public in 1994 to reduce the persistent debt from the leveraged buyout. In 1998 the key business was shuttered while Things Remembered and its 800+ stores failed to meet sales goals. Restructuring and an image change were necessary. Cole National brought in a CRM agency which revealed the store was seen as a "brass and glass" gift shop that offered some engraving. In reaction, the company focused on this removing all non-personalized gifts and the motto was changed from Great Unexpected Gifts" to "The Place for Personalized Gifts." Research also showed their typical patrons were women who viewed themselves as unique gift givers. This moved the company to make stores warm and less masculine. Store associates took the title "Gift Advisers" with the premise that interactions with customers were conversations between two friends coming up with a gift idea. Things Remembered also released its first catalog during this time. There were three versions: General Gift, Wedding and Business focused. The combined strategies paid off almost instantly allowing the company to meet sales projections in 1999 for the first time in years.

CNC which now owned Pearl vision had become the target of Luxottica, parent company of LensCrafters. The sale went through in 2004 and Things Remembered was quickly spun off in 2006 to investment firms Bruckmann Rosser Sherrill & Co. and GB Merchant Partners for $200 Million. The chain was sold again in 2012 to Chicago-based private equity Firm Madison Dearborn Partners for $295 Million which also backs fellow mall retailer Yankee Candle. Prior to 2014, Things Remembered expanded to Canada purchasing Key Man Engravables and slowly converted each store to TR1. In 2014, Michael Anthony who had been CEO since the Luxottica spin off stepped down with former Talbots and Express executive Lisa Gavales taking the helm. In June 2017, Lisa Gavales resigned and Things Remembered appointed a new president.

In February 2019, Things Remembered filed for Chapter 11 bankruptcy.

On March 8, 2019, Enesco, LLC, a global leader in the giftware, home décor, and accessories industries acquired Things Remembered, Inc., the North American leading omnichannel retailer of personalized gifts and merchandise. Things Remembered continued to operate more than 170 retail locations, as well as its online, direct mail, and B2B retail businesses, all under its brand name. On November 22, 2019, Enesco announced its CEO Todd Mavis would also become CEO of Things Remembered.

On December 28, 2022, it was announced that it would close all retail locations.

On January 10, 2023, 1-800-Flowers.com, Inc announced the acquisition of the Things Remembered brand, allowing the brand to continue on as a retailer.
