= 1947 Cleveland mayoral election =

Cleveland mayoral election, 1947
- November 4, 1947
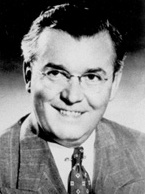

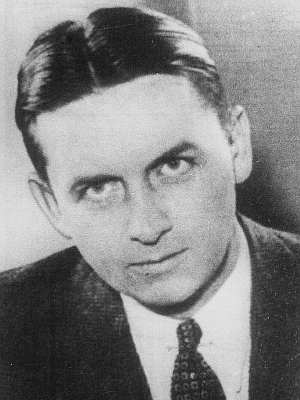
Nominee	Thomas A. Burke	Eliot Ness
Party	Democratic	Republican
Popular vote	168,412	85,990
Percentage	66.20%	33.80%
Mayor before election
Thomas A. Burke
Democratic
Elected mayor
Thomas A. Burke
Democratic

The Cleveland mayoral election of 1947 saw the election of Thomas A. Burke as Mayor of Cleveland, defeating Republican challenger Eliot Ness.

== General election ==
1947 Cleveland mayoral reelection (general election)
Party	Candidate	Votes	%
Democratic	Thomas A. Burke (incumbent)	168,412	66.20%
Republican	Eliot Ness	85,990	33.80%
Turnout		254,402	
