= Anthony J. Celebrezze Federal Building =

Skyscraper in Cleveland, Ohio

Coordinates: 41.50488°N 81.69208°W

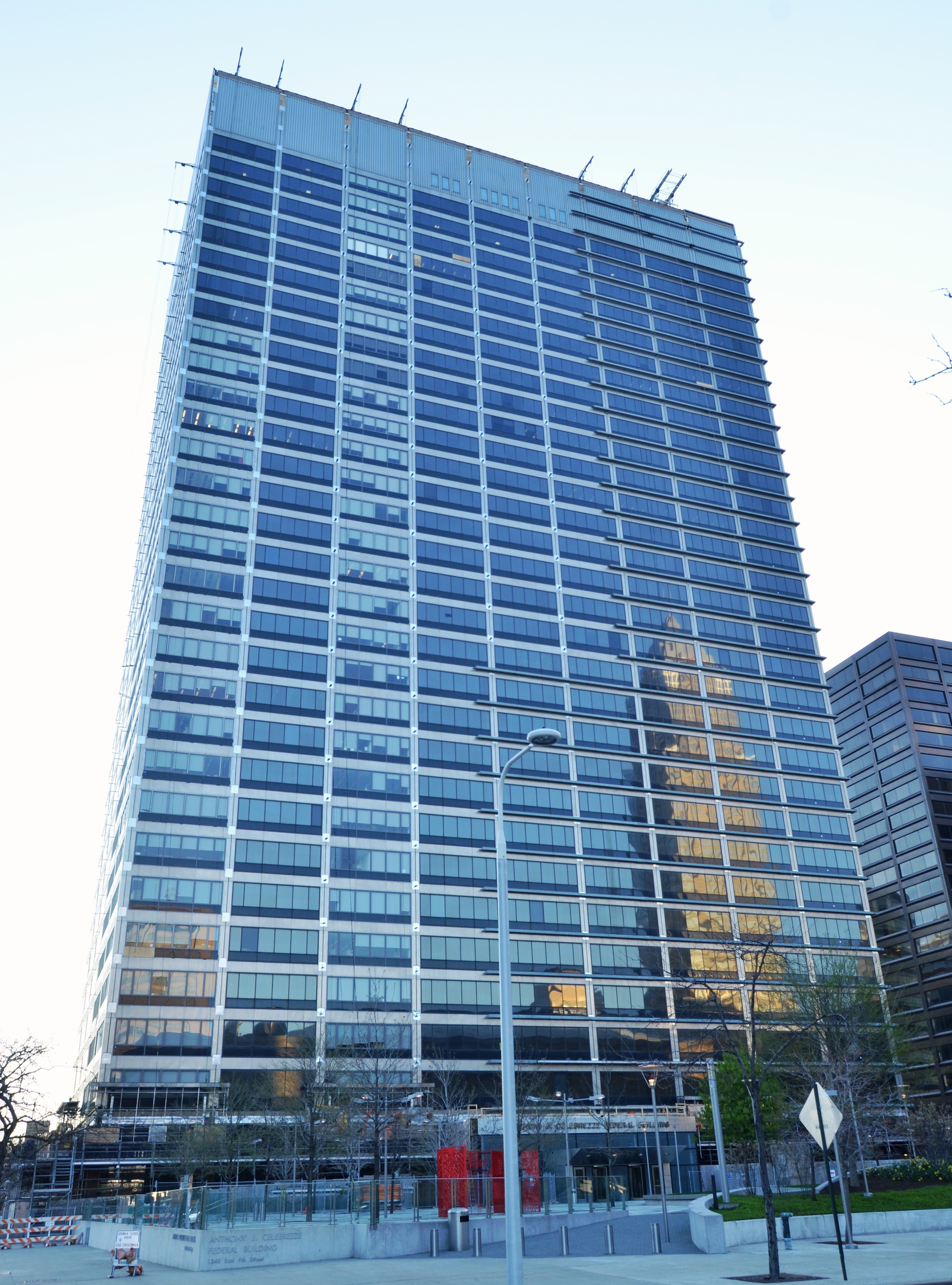
- The Anthony J. Celebrezze Federal Building in 2013, mid-renovation
- Interactive map of the Anthony J. Celebrezze Federal Building area

General information
- Status: Completed
- Type: Office
- Location: 1240 East Ninth Street; Cleveland, Ohio 44199; United States
- Construction started: 1964
- Completed: Fall 1966
- Owner: U.S. Government
- Operator: Maureen Michael

Height
- Roof: 419 feet (128 m)
- Top floor: 32

Technical details
- Floor area: 577,000 sq ft (53,600 m^{2})

Design and construction
- Architect: Multiple
- Structural engineer: Barber & Hoffman, Inc.
- Main contractor: Huber Hunt & Nichols; Frank Briscoe Co., Inc.

The Anthony J. Celebrezze Federal Building (also known as the Federal Office Building, the Celebrezze Building, or the Federal Building for short) is a skyscraper located in downtown Cleveland, Ohio.

== Design ==
The building was designed by the firms of Outcault, Guenther, Rode & Bonebrake, Schafer, Flynn & Van Dijk, and Dalton, Dalton, Little, and Newport, The building has 32 stories, rises to a height of 419 feet (128 m), 1,007,000 square feet (93,600 m^{2}) of space, and is located at 1240 East 9th Street. Huber Hunt and Nicols served as general architects and contractors. It was completed in the Fall of 1966 and opened in 1967 and houses U.S. government agency offices.

== History ==
Named after Cleveland's 49th mayor, United States Secretary of Health, Education, and Welfare and Federal appeals judge Anthony J. Celebrezze, the Federal Building is typical of the modern, commercial office buildings of the 1960s. It displays strength in design through a purity and rich variety of materials. When construction began, protesters demonstrated against the lack of minority contractors. Problems with the foundation delayed construction. As the building was being built, a piece of the building's stainless-steel skin fell, hitting a parked car on Lakeside Avenue. As Federal agencies were moving in 1967–68, a fire hose on the 25th floor burst, causing water damage.

== Appearance ==
The building is wrapped in a skin of stainless steel and glass. It is lifted by a base of four recessed rectilinear marble volumes, resting upon a field of rough cut slate and granite. Walls of glass stretch taut between two larger end volumes, creating an interior lobby and plazas to the east and west with the smaller volumes encasing double-sided elevator shafts.

== Plot ==
Construction for the Federal Building began with the demolition of the Old Central Armory and the Cuyahoga County Morgue. The Armory building was designed by Lehman and Schmitt and constructed in 1896. It was made in a late Victorian style with a Gothic exterior. The Morgue, constructed in 1894, showed examples of Egyptian Revival architecture.

== Renovations ==
Between 2003 and 2006, The Cleveland Federal Building massively renovated its entrances. The original entrances were cold and foreboding, but have recently been glass-enclosed and modernized for today's security and comfort. When the Federal Building opened in 1967, the biggest problem was winds off Lake Erie. People would have to hold on by pull ropes on the railings of the steps. In Cleveland's brutal winters of 1976–77 and 1977–78, the GSA placed plexiglass covers for shielding due to winds. In 2008, a new fire alarm system was installed, leaks in the roof over the underground cafeteria were repaired, and new landscaping was installed. In 2011 work began on a new exterior which will increase the energy efficiency of the building. Funding for the $121 million project came from the 2009 economic stimulus package.

In 2002, the Cleveland FBI office, which serves Northeast Ohio, moved from the Federal Building to its own offices a block away due to safety and security logistics. When the FBI arrested a criminal, they had to ride in the same elevators as people who had business in the building. Federal agencies with offices in the building include the Defense Finance and Accounting Service, the U.S. Coast Guard Great Lakes District Command Center, recruiting offices for the Armed Forces, the Small Business Administration, U.S. Department of Veterans Affairs, and the Social Security Administration.

== See also ==
- List of tallest buildings in Cleveland
