= Paul Whelton =

Irish-American physician and scientist

Paul Kieran Whelton
- Education: MBBCh, BAO (National University of Ireland, University College Cork), MD (National University of Ireland, University College Cork), MSc (University of London)
- Occupation: Epidemiologist
- Organization: Tulane University
- Known for: Cardiovascular disease and renal disease epidemiology, prevention, treatment trials, policy, and global health

Paul Kieran Whelton is an Irish-born American physician and scientist who has contributed to the fields of hypertension and kidney disease epidemiology. He also mentored several public health leaders including the deans of the schools of public health at Johns Hopkins (Michael Klag) and Columbia (Linda Fried). He currently serves as the Show Chwan Health Care System Endowed Chair in Global Public Health and a Clinical Professor in the Department of Epidemiology at the Tulane University School of Public Health and Tropical Medicine. He is the founding director of the Welch Center for Prevention, Epidemiology, and Clinical Research at Johns Hopkins University.

== Early life and education ==
Whelton is a native of Cork City, Ireland. He qualified from the medical school at University College Cork (UCC), with a M.B., B.Ch., and a B.A.O in 1970. He later secured his M.Sc. in epidemiology from the London School of Hygiene & Tropical Medicine, graduating in 1981, and later still earned an advanced research degree in medicine from the National University of Ireland, awarded in 2003.

== Career ==
Whelton served as a professor of epidemiology at the Johns Hopkins School of Hygiene and Public Health, as well as a professor of medicine at the School of Medicine. He was also a director of the Outpatient General clinical Research Center.

In 1989, Whelton became the founding director of the Welch Center for Prevention, Epidemiology, and Clinical Research at Johns Hopkins University, in Baltimore, Maryland. In 1997, he moved from Baltimore to New Orleans, Louisiana, to serve as the dean of the Tulane University School of Public Health and Tropical Medicine. He also served as the dean of the School of Medicine at Tulane, and as senior vice president for health sciences at the Tulane University Health Sciences Center.

In 2007, he moved from New Orleans to Chicago, Illinois, to serve as the president and CEO of the Loyola University Health System and Medical Center, as well as the Senior Vice President for Health Sciences and a professor of preventive medicine and epidemiology at the Stritch School of Medicine. In 2011, he moved back to New Orleans and currently is the Chwan Health System Endowed Chair in Global Public Health at the Tulane University School of Public Health and Tropical Medicine.

== Roles ==
- National Chair of the Anti-hypertensive and Lipid Lowering Treatment to Prevent heart Attack Trial (ALLHAT)
- National Chair of the Systolic Blood Pressure Intervention Trial (SPRINT)
- Member of the Johns Hopkins Society of Scholars
- Recipient of the Distinguished Alumnus Award from National University of Ireland, University College Cork
- American Heart Association Population Research Prize

== Honors and awards ==
- 1979 - 1984 Milbank Scholar in Epidemiology (Career Development Award for Clinical Epidemiology Training)
- 1985 Fellow, American College of Clinical Pharmacology
- 1987 Tenth Annual Master Lecturer, St. Catherine Hospital, Chicago
- 1989 Fellow, Royal Academy of Medicine in Ireland (Epidemiology Section)
- 1989 Delta Omega Honorary Public Health Society - Alpha Chapter
- 1991 Fellow, Royal College of Physicians of Ireland (Faculty of Public Health Medicine)
- 1991 Honorary member, Chilean Society of Hypertension
- 1992 Dean’s Lecture, Johns Hopkins University School of Hygiene and Public Health
- 1995 Fellow, American College of Epidemiology
- 1995 Professor (Honorary), Peking Union Medical College and Chinese Academy of Medical Sciences, Beijing, China
- 1996 Interurban Club (Elected Member)
- 1997 Visiting Professor, University of Auckland, Auckland, New Zealand
- 1997 Wade Hampton Frost Lecturer, Johns Hopkins University School of Hygiene and Public Health
- 1997 AOA Lecturer, Tulane University School of Medicine
- 1997 Professor (Honorary), Beijing Medical University School of Public Health, Beijing, China
- 1997 Fellow, American Heart Association, Council for High Blood Pressure Research
- 2003 Johns Hopkins Society of Scholars (Elected member), Induction Ceremony, May 22, 2003, Baltimore, Maryland
- 2003 Distinguished Alumnus Award, National University of Ireland, University College Cork, Faculty of Medicine and Health
- 2004 Presidential Award for outstanding contributions to the field of hypertension, American Society of Hypertension, Gulf Central Regional Chapter, New Orleans, Louisiana
- 2005 Honorary Professor, Soochow University, Suzhou, China
- 2005 Award for "heroic efforts, outstanding accomplishments, and immense compassion in response to the catastrophic events surrounding Hurricane Katrina," Association of Academic Health Centers
- 2005 United States Department of Veterans Affairs, Medal for Leadership – Post Hurricane Katrina
- 2006 Senior Leadership Katrina Recognition Award: Survival, Recovery, Renewal, Tulane University, New Orleans, Louisiana
- 2006 "Paul Whelton: Rebuilding Tulane after Hurricane Katrina," Profile published in The Lancet.
- 2012 Show Chwan Health System Endowed Chair in Global Public Health Tulane University School of Public Health and Tropical Medicine Inaugural holder (investiture, Dec 4, 2012)
- 2012 International Union of Angiology, Award of Honorary Membership Prague, July 2012
- 2014 "Honorary President", Show Chwan Health System---in recognition of lifetime contributions to strengthening the System’s leadership team and enhancing the quality of the patient care, research and educational programs at Show Chwan’s nine campuses in Taiwan and China
- 2015 Welch Center for Prevention, Epidemiology and Clinical Research Johns Hopkins School of Medicine and Johns Hopkins Bloomberg School of Public Health 25th Anniversary Celebration award for "extraordinary vision, magnanimous support, and boundless wisdom"
- 2015 Visiting Professor, Yale School of Medicine, Yale University and Moser Memorial lecturer (inaugural presenter)
