= Joseph E. Cole =

American businessman

- Born: January 4, 1914; Cleveland, Ohio, U.S.
- Died: January 8, 1995 (aged 81); Palm Beach, Florida
- Occupation: Businessman
- Employer: Cole National Corp.

Joseph Edmund Cole (January 4, 1914 – January 8, 1995) was an American businessman. He was founder of Cole National Corp. and the final publisher of the Cleveland Press newspaper, as well as part-owner of the Cleveland Indians major league baseball team.

== Business career ==
Cole was born January 4, 1914, in Cleveland, Ohio. He began his career in 1926 working for the National Key Company in Cleveland. After working for the company for seven years, he left to establish a retail key division of Curtis Industries, building it into the country's second-largest key company, after National Key. In 1950, Cole purchased National Key as well as Curtis's key business, becoming the largest key retail business in the United States. As the company grew, diversifying into such areas as car dealerships, the Things Remembered gift shop, and the Original Cookie Company, it was renamed Cole National Corp.

In the 1950s, Cole became a minority owner of the Cleveland Indians (now "Guardians") baseball team; he twice attempted to purchase the team in its entirety, but was unsuccessful.

In 1980, Cole purchased the struggling Cleveland Press newspaper. He expanded the paper's publication to seven days, adding a Sunday edition, but ultimately the newspaper ceased publication in 1982.

== Political activity ==
Cole was active in the U.S. Democratic Party. He served as chairman of the Ohio campaign for John F. Kennedy's presidential campaign in 1960, and gave financial support to Hubert Humphrey's presidential campaign in 1968. He became treasurer of the party in 1973, and served on the Democratic National Committee and its executive committee.

== Death ==
Cole died January 8, 1995, in Palm Beach, Florida from complications from a stroke, shortly after his 81st birthday.
