= 1954 United States Senate special election in Ohio =

1954 American election

- November 6, 1954
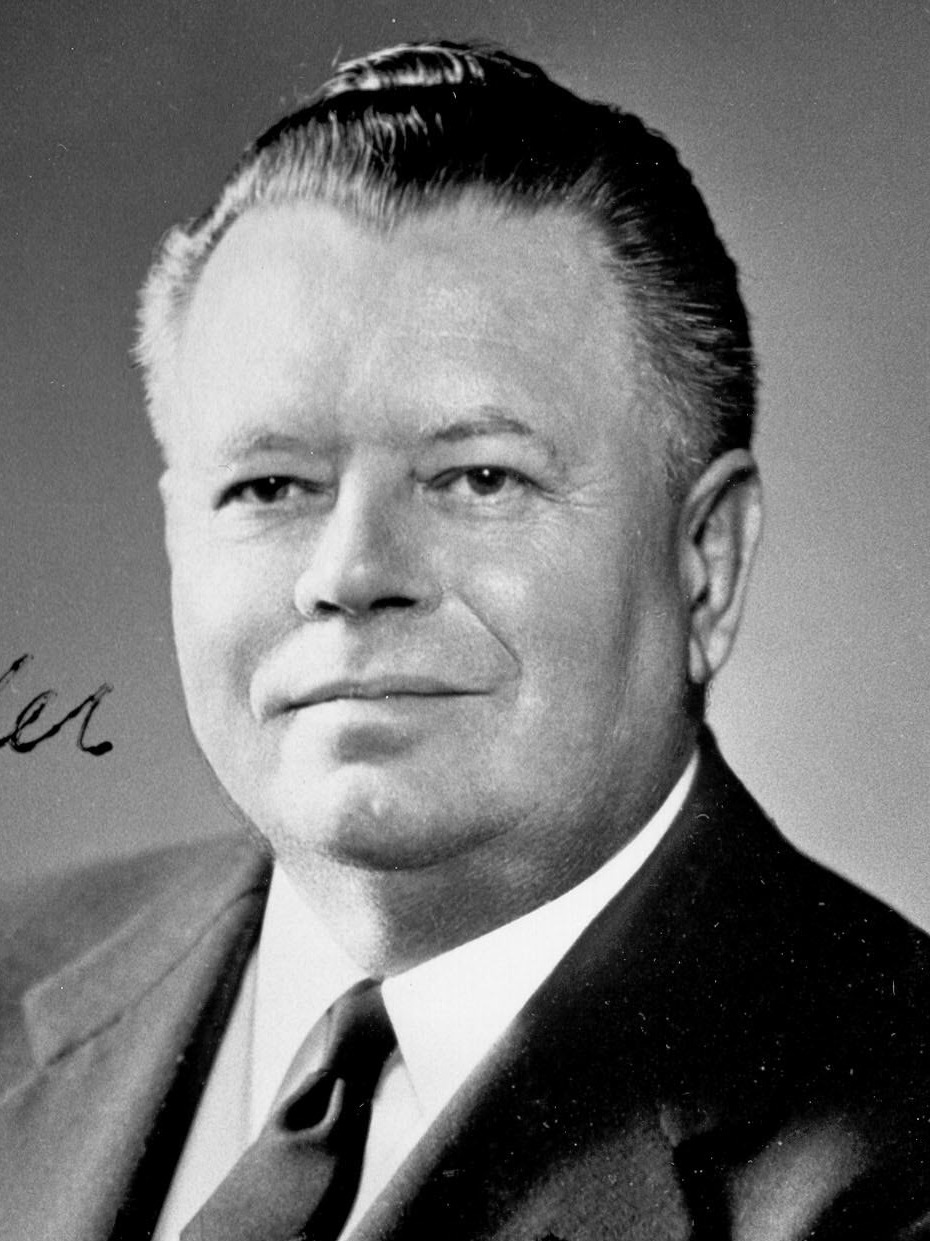

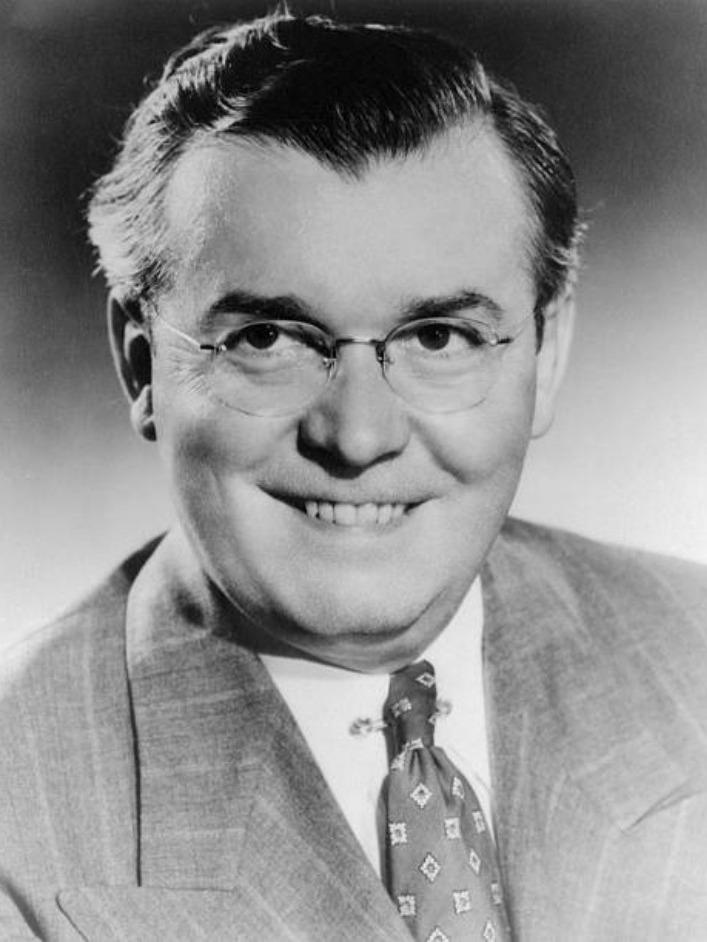
Nominee	George H. Bender	Thomas A. Burke
Party	Republican	Democratic
Popular vote	1,257,874	1,254,904
Percentage	50.06%	49.94%
- County results Bender: 50–60% 60–70% 70–80% Burke: 50–60% 60–70%
U.S. senator before election
Thomas A. Burke
Democratic
Elected U.S. Senator
George H. Bender
Republican

The United States Senate special election in Ohio of 1954 was held on November 2, 1954, to complete the unexpired term of late Senator Robert A. Taft, who died in office on July 31, 1953. Senator Thomas A. Burke (who was appointed as Taft's successor) ran to complete the term in office but was narrowly defeated by U.S. Representative George Bender. The next special election for the senate in Ohio would occur in 2026 for this seat. This was also the last time until 2024 that a Republican defeated an incumbent Democratic senator in Ohio.

== Background ==
On July 31, 1953, incumbent Republican Senator Robert A. Taft died in office. His term was scheduled to expire in 1957. Governor Frank Lausche appointed Thomas A. Burke, the Democratic Mayor of Cleveland, to fill his seat until a successor could be duly elected.

The special election was scheduled for November 2, 1954, concurrent with the regularly scheduled state and federal elections. Burke ran to complete the term. This was the last U.S. Senate special election in Ohio until the one to this seat in 2026.

== Republican primary ==
=== Candidates ===
- George H. Bender, U.S. Representative from Chagrin Falls
- William B. Saxbe, State Representative from Mechanicsburg

=== Results ===
1954 Republican Senate special primary
Party	Candidate	Votes	%
Republican	George H. Bender	254,390	57.40%
Republican	William B. Saxbe	188,783	42.60%
Total votes		443,173	100.00%

== General election ==
1954 United States Senate special election in Ohio
Party	Candidate	Votes	%	±%
Republican	George Bender	1,257,874	50.06%	▼7.48
Democratic	Thomas A. Burke (incumbent)	1,254,904	49.94%	▲7.48
Total votes		2,512,778	100.0%	

== See also ==
- 1954 United States Senate elections
