= Experience Corps =

AARP Foundation Experience Corps is an intergenerational, volunteer-based tutoring program that engages adults age 50 and older as literacy tutors for struggling students in public schools. The program aims to empower volunteers to serve in their community and work with America's most vulnerable children.

As part of a network of branches and affiliates, each AARP Foundation Experience Corps site operates one of three tutoring models: one -to -one, small group, and literacy assistance (where volunteers tutor and help teachers with classroom-wide activities). Local community organizations implement the program with the support of the AARP Foundation Experience Corps national office.

Volunteers provide an average of 6–15 hours of support each week per week in the classroom, coaching and encouraging children who are not yet reading at grade level.

== Research ==
AARP Foundation Experience Corps is an evidence-based intervention. Research shows that the program boosts student academic performance, helps schools and youth-serving organizations become more successful, and strengthens ties between these institutions and surrounding neighborhoods.

Johns Hopkins University and Washington University in St. Louis studies have also linked the program with improved health among volunteers. They found that older adults who volunteer in urban schools not only improve the educational experience of children, but also realize improvements in their own mental and physical health, including reduced symptoms of depression.

Students in the program have made greater gains in reading skill than their peers. Additionally, surveys of urban principals have shown that they welcome AARP Foundation Experience Corps in their schools because of the positive impact.

== Beginnings ==
The program had its beginnings in a 1988 concept paper by John W. Gardner, former Secretary of Health, Education, and Welfare and founder of Common Cause. Gardner's idea was to create a new institution that would mobilize the time, talent, and experience of older Americans to revitalize their communities. He called it Experience Corps and later would become advisory board chair for the program's pilot project.

Gardner's notion became reality some seven years later with the launch of an Experience Corps pilot project. The Experience Corps pilot was designed in 1993–1995 by Dr. Linda Fried and Marc Freedman. In developing the program, they drew upon volunteering best practices and scientific evidence for the effective health promotion for older adults. Public/Private Ventures (P/PV), a nonprofit organization that develops innovative strategies to help disadvantaged children, served as the managing partner for this effort, working in close collaboration with the National Senior Service Corps of the Corporation for National Service (CNS) and researchers from Johns Hopkins University.

After a planning and start-up phase that began in summer 1995, an 18-month pilot was conducted in 12 schools in Philadelphia; the South Bronx; Minneapolis; Portland, (Oregon); and Port Arthur, (Texas). The first Experience Corps volunteers began participating in early 1996. Each of the five pilot projects was sponsored by a lead agency in those cities, either a Foster Grandparents or RSVP program in every case. The projects agreed to place teams of 15 half-time Experience Corps members in some of the neediest inner-city elementary schools in their communities. In return, each project received $175,000 for the two-year period to plan, develop, and implement Experience Corps in their city.

== Expansion ==
Beginning in 1997–1998, after the two-year pilot, the Corporation for National and Community Service provided additional funding for an expansion of Experience Corps (called the Seniors for Schools initiative). This new round of activity brought with it two key changes from the pilot phase. First, non-stipended opportunities were added for volunteers to serve on a less intensive basis than the 15-hour-a-week positions that were at the core of the program. As a result, an older person interested in becoming part of Experience Corps was provided greater choice in selecting a role within the program. Second, the program moved more significantly toward a focus on improving reading for low-income students in kindergarten through third grade. The Seniors for Schools program included the original five Experience Corps pilot projects and expanded to include projects in Boston; Cleveland; Kansas City; and Leesburg, (Florida).

Meanwhile, in January 1998 Public/Private Ventures helped spin off Encore.org (known as Civic Ventures at the time) as a new nonprofit organization to focus specifically on developing Experience Corps, and more broadly on creating new civic roles for Americans 50+ in our society. Encore.org quickly raised funds to further expand Experience Corps, including two ongoing demonstration projects: One initiative adapted the in-school Experience Corps model to the non-school hours, working in YMCAs, Boys and Girls Clubs, and other community youth organizations. The second tested the use of seed grants to expand the elementary school model to new cities, including San Francisco; Washington, D.C.; Indianapolis; Phoenix; and Durham. Since 1999, two additional Experience Corps projects, focused on the in-school model, began operating in Baltimore (through Johns Hopkins Center on Aging and Health) and New York City (through United Neighborhood Houses).

In 2008, the Center for Social Development at Washington University in St. Louis conducted a national evaluation of the Experience Corps. The evaluation found that 99% of tutors thought they helped the children they worked with, and 58% of volunteers indicated they would be "very likely" to continue volunteering after the first year.

In late 2011, Experience Corps joined forces with AARP, becoming part of AARP Foundation — the charitable affiliate of AARP — in 2015. The program's intergenerational approach supported the Foundation's goal to help adults 50+ win back opportunity, take control and reconnect with their communities.
