= Frank D. Celebrezze Jr. =

American judge (born 1952)

Frank Daniel Celebrezze Jr. (born February 22, 1952) is an American judge.

== Biography ==
Celebrezze was born on February 22, 1952. He graduated from Holy Name High School and attended Ohio State University and the University of Maryland (European Division). Celebrezze served in the U.S. Navy from 1974 to 1980, serving as a radioman for NATO command in Naples, Italy. He received a Bachelor of Arts degree from Cleveland State University in 1980 and a Juris Doctor degree from the Cleveland State University College of Law in 1983.

Celebrezze entered the private practice of law and then, from 1987 to 1991, served as a district hearing officer for the Industrial Commission of Ohio. From 1991 to 1993, he was a staff attorney with the Cuyahoga County treasurer's office.

The son of former Ohio Chief Justice Frank Celebrezze, Celebrezze won a seat as a common pleas court judge in 1992, was re-elected in 1998, and then won a seat as an Ohio appeals court judge (Eighth District) in 2000. He resigned from the common pleas bench on January 1, 2001, to take the appeals bench. He has sat on the Ohio Supreme Court by appointment of Chief Justice Thomas J. Moyer.

Celebrezze's grandfather was Frank D. Celebrezze I. His granduncle, Anthony J. Celebrezze, was a member of John F. Kennedy and Lyndon B. Johnson's cabinets. His first cousin once removed was gubernatorial candidate Anthony J. Celebrezze Jr. and his uncle was Ohio Supreme Court Judge James Celebrezze. He has two daughters.
