= Department of the Treasury =

Department of (the) Treasury or similar may refer to:

- Department of the Treasury (Australia)
  - Department of Treasury and Finance (South Australia)
  - Department of Treasury and Finance (Victoria)
  - Department of Treasury (Western Australia)
- Department of the Treasury (Isle of Man)
- Puerto Rico Department of Treasury
- United States Department of the Treasury

Bodies called Department of the Treasury often exist for English-speaking countries' subnational divisions, such as:

- Provinces of Canada
- States of Australia
- States of the United States
