= John W. Gardner =

American politician (1912–2002)

John Gardner
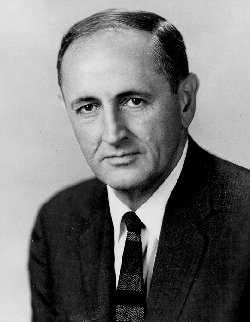

6th United States Secretary of Health, Education, and Welfare
- In office August 18, 1965 – March 1, 1968
- President: Lyndon B. Johnson
- Preceded by: Anthony J. Celebrezze
- Succeeded by: Wilbur J. Cohen

Personal details
- Born: John William Gardner; October 8, 1912 Los Angeles, California, U.S.
- Died: February 16, 2002 (aged 89) Palo Alto, California, U.S.
- Resting place: San Francisco National Cemetery
- Party: Republican
- Spouse: Aida Gardner
- Education: Stanford University (BA); University of California, Berkeley (MA, PhD)
- Awards: Presidential Medal of Freedom (1964); Public Welfare Medal (1966)

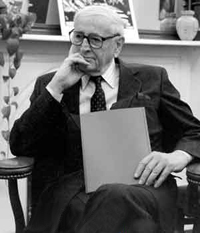
Gardner from White House Fellows release

John William Gardner (October 8, 1912 – February 16, 2002) was US Secretary of Health, Education, and Welfare (HEW) under Lyndon Johnson. He was a strong advocate for citizen participation and founded Common Cause; he became known as "the father of campaign finance reform".

== Education and military service ==
A native of California, Gardner attended Stanford University. As an undergrad he set several swimming records and won a number of Pacific Coast championships, and graduated "with great distinction." After earning a Ph.D. in psychology at the University of California, Berkeley, in 1938, Dr. Gardner taught at Connecticut College and at Mount Holyoke.

During the early days of World War II he was chief of the Latin American Section, Foreign Broadcast Intelligence Service. He subsequently entered the United States Marine Corps and was assigned to the O.S.S., serving in Italy and Austria.

== Early career ==
Gardner joined the staff of the Carnegie Corporation of New York in 1946, and in 1955 he became president of that group, and concurrently, the Carnegie Foundation for the Advancement of Teaching. He also served as an advisor to the U.S. delegation to the United Nations and as a consultant to the U.S. Air Force, which awarded him the Exceptional Service Award in 1956.

Gardner was a trustee of the Metropolitan Museum of Art and of the Educational Testing Service and a director of the Woodrow Wilson Foundation. He served as chairman of the Rockefeller Brothers Fund Panel on Education, and was chief draftsman of that group's widely circulated report, The Pursuit of Excellence.

Gardner authored books on improving leadership in American society and other subjects. He was also the founder of two prestigious fellowship programs, The White House Fellows and The John Gardner Fellowship at Stanford University and U.C. Berkeley. He received the Presidential Medal of Freedom in 1964. In 1966 Gardner was awarded the Public Welfare Medal from the National Academy of Sciences.

== Secretary of Health, Education, and Welfare (HEW) ==
Gardner's term as Secretary of HEW was at the height of Johnson's Great Society domestic agenda. He was the only Republican in Johnson's cabinet. During this tenure, the department undertook both the huge task of launching Medicare, which brought quality health care to senior citizens, and oversaw significant expansions of the landmark Elementary and Secondary Education Act of 1965 that redefined the federal role in education and targeted funding to poor students. Gardner resigned as head of HEW because he could not support the war in Vietnam.

Gardner was featured on the cover and in an article of the January 20, 1967 Time magazine, and later that year also presided over the creation of the Corporation for Public Broadcasting.

== Later life ==
Gardner later served on the Stanford University Board of Trustees from 1968 to 1982. On August 18, 1970, Gardner founded Common Cause, and also founded the Experience Corps in the same year.

In 1973, he received the S. Roger Horchow Award for Greatest Public Service by a Private Citizen, an award given out annually by Jefferson Awards. In 1980–1983 he co-founded Independent Sector, which lobbies and does public relations work on behalf of tax-exempt organizations in order to retain the charitable deduction.

In September 2000, Gardner lent his name and support to the John W. Gardner Center for Youth and Their Communities at Stanford University, a center that partners with communities to develop leadership, conduct research, and effect change to improve the lives of youth.

Gardner died of prostate cancer in Palo Alto on February 16, 2002. He was buried in San Francisco National Cemetery.

== Publications and speeches ==
- Excellence: Can We Be Equal and Excellent Too? (1961)
- To Turn the Tide (1962)
- Self-Renewal: The Individual and the Innovative Society (1964)
- No Easy Victories (1968)
- Uncritical Lovers, Unloving Critics (1968)
- The Recovery of Confidence (1970)
- In Common Cause (1972)
- Morale (1978)
- Quotations of Wit and Wisdom (1980)
- On Leadership (1990)
- Living, Leading, and the American Dream (2003)
- Commencement Address at Stanford's 100th Commencement Ceremony (Speech). Stanford University. June 16, 1991.

== The John Gardner Fellowship Program ==
The John Gardner Fellowship Program was established in 1985 by Stanford University and the University of California, Berkeley to honor Gardner. The fellowship encourages highly motivated graduating seniors to pursue careers in public and community service. Three fellows from each university are chosen annually and provided with placement assistance and a senior mentor in their placement organization. Past placements have included the White House, the United States Department of State, and various nonprofit organizations.

Initial funding for the fellowship was provided by the Walter and Elise Haas Fund, the Carnegie Corporation of New York, the Educational Foundation of America, the Ewing Marion Kauffman Foundation, the UC Berkeley Chancellor's Millennium Fund, and Michael Walsh. Over time, additional supporters have contributed to the program.

The John Gardner Fellowship Association is an association of John Gardner Fellowship alumni from both Stanford University and the University of California, Berkeley, whose mission is to carry on Gardner's legacy of public service and ensure that the Fellowship programs at both schools have adequate resources for success.

Notable former fellows include Gary Rosen, editor of The Wall Street Journal's Weekend Review (1988–1989), Rachel Maddow (1994–1995), and Heather Podesta (1993–1994).

Political offices
Preceded by Anthony J. Celebrezze	United States Secretary of Health, Education, and Welfare; August 18, 1965 – March 1, 1968	Succeeded by Wilbur J. Cohen
