= Cleveland Press =

Major newspaper of Cleveland, Ohio (1878–1982)

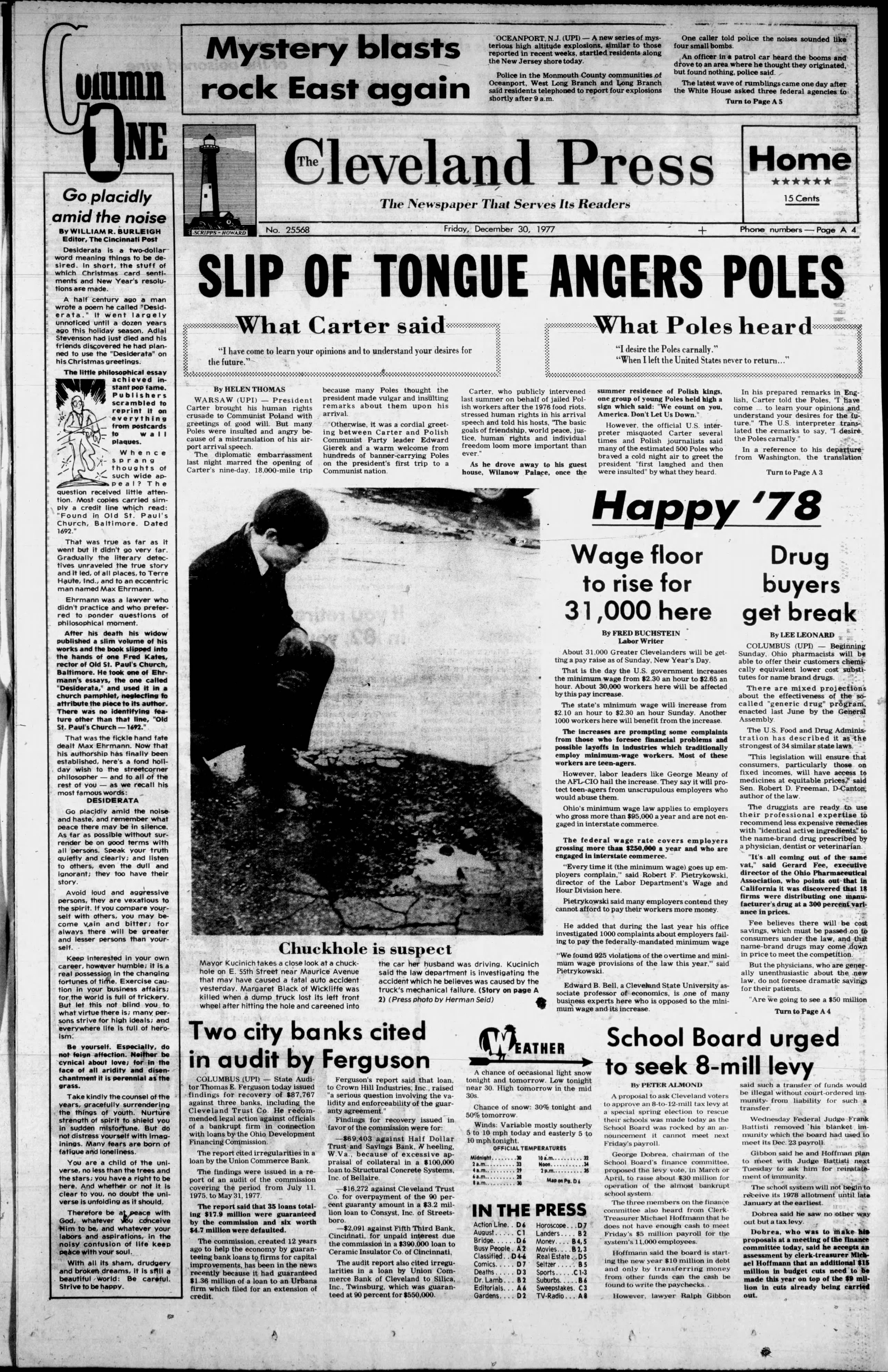
- Front page of the December 30, 1977 issue
- Type: Daily newspaper
- Format: Broadsheet
- Owner(s): Scripps-Howard; Joseph E. Cole
- Editor: Joseph E. Cole
- Founded: November 2, 1878
- Ceased publication: June 17, 1982
- Headquarters: Cleveland, Ohio, US

The Cleveland Press was a daily American newspaper published in Cleveland, Ohio from November 2, 1878, through June 17, 1982. From 1928 to 1966, the paper's editor was Louis B. Seltzer.

Known for many years as one of the country's most influential newspapers for its focus on working class issues, its neighborhood orientation, its promotion of public service, and its editorial involvement in political campaigns at the state and local levels, the paper may best be remembered for its controversial role in the 1954 Sam Sheppard murder case.

== History ==
The paper was founded by Edward W. Scripps as the Penny Press in 1878. It was the first newspaper in what would become the Scripps-Howard chain. The name was shortened to the Press in 1884, before finally becoming the Cleveland Press in 1889. By the turn of the century, the Press had become Cleveland's leading daily newspaper, bypassing its main competitor, The Plain Dealer.

During the 1920s, the Press reached nearly 200,000 in circulation and stood out by proposing the city manager form of government for Cleveland, while also supporting Progressive candidate Robert M. La Follette Sr. for president in 1924. Louis B. Seltzer became the paper's 12th editor in 1928, and stressed the area's neighborhoods, promoting the slogan "The Newspaper That Serves Its Readers."

The paper endorsed winning mayoral candidates Frank J. Lausche and Anthony J. Celebrezze. Among the paper's foremost writers from the 1940s–1970s were Jack Ballantine and Dick Feagler.

However, the Press was criticized for its role, led by editor-in-chief Louis B. Seltzer, in the conviction of Dr. Sam Sheppard in 1954 for the murder of his wife, Marilyn. A Federal judge stated, "If ever there was a trial by newspaper, this is a perfect example. And the most insidious example was the Cleveland Press. For some reason that newspaper took upon itself the role of accuser, judge and jury." The appeals process eventually made its way to the U.S. Supreme Court. The paper's aggressive coverage that goaded local officials and potentially prejudiced the jury resulted in a ruling that pre-trial publicity had been injurious to Sheppard. It was a major reason why a new trial was ordered where Sheppard was acquitted in 1966.

In January 1960, Scripps-Howard purchased Press rival the Cleveland News (also an afternoon paper) and merged it with the Press giving the city one afternoon newspaper under the Press banner. Four years later, the Press was named one of America's 10 best newspapers in a list compiled by Time magazine, but under Seltzer's successor, Thomas L. Boardman, the Press began a decline that was shared in general with other large afternoon dailies throughout the country.

The Press was passed in circulation by The Plain Dealer in 1968, and after Boardman's retirement in 1979, rumors began circulating that the Press would shortly suspend publication unless a buyer could be found. Scripps-Howard sold the paper on October 31, 1980, to Cleveland businessman Joseph E. Cole, who purchased the paper only after gaining concessions from the employee unions.

=== Closing ===
Cole introduced a Sunday edition on August 2, 1981, followed by a morning edition on March 22, 1982. The morning edition was sold on newsstands only. Color presses were introduced, and circulation increased from 303,400 in March 1981 to 316,100 a year later. However, local effects of the early 1980s recession, coupled with losses in advertising and an inability for Cole to find investors or a buyer, resulted in the paper's closing; the final issue was published on June 17, 1982. Rumors of the paper's closure emerged the evening before and was covered on local television, but the Plain Dealer refused to cover it pending official confirmation, which occurred later that morning. Cole said in the Press's final issue, "[s]ome say we failed in this venture. I feel sadness but not failure."

In 1983, Cole donated the paper's archives to Cleveland State University, which houses them in their Michael Schwartz Library. The Cleveland Press Collection consists of clippings and photographs which were digitized beginning in the 1990s as part of the Cleveland Memory Project. CSU fully digitized the paper's entire microfiche library with assistance from Newspapers.com, a process that took four years.

== See also ==
- The Akron Press
