= Linda P. Fried =

American epidemiologist

Linda Fried
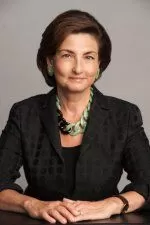

Dean of Columbia University Mailman School of Public Health
- In office 2008–2025
- Preceded by: Allan Rosenfield

Personal details
- Born: 1949 (age 76–77)
- Spouse: Joseph Margolick
- Relatives: Barbara Fried (sister); Sam Bankman-Fried (nephew)
- Education: University of Wisconsin–Madison (BA); Rush University (MD); Johns Hopkins University (MPH)
- Website: Linda Fried

Linda P. Fried (born 1949) is an American geriatrician and epidemiologist, who was also the first female Dean of Columbia University's Mailman School of Public Health. Her research career is focused on frailty, healthy aging, and how society can successfully transition to benefit from an aging population.

== Early life and education ==
She attended Hunter College High School and earned a bachelor's degree in history from the University of Wisconsin–Madison in 1970. She received her M.D. from Rush Medical College in Chicago in 1979 and her M.P.H. at Johns Hopkins in 1984, where she worked with Paul Whelton. She trained in internal medicine at Rush Presbyterian-St. Luke's Medical Center in Chicago. After fellowship training in internal medicine, she expanded her focus to the aging population and received a fellowship in Hopkins's geriatrics program.

== Career ==
In 1985, Fried accepted joint faculty appointments in the Johns Hopkins School of Medicine and School of Hygiene and Public Health. She then served as director of geriatric medicine and was the founding director of the Johns Hopkins Center on Aging and Health, which studies the epidemiology of aging, relationships between aging and health, and interventions to improve health with aging. In 2008, Fried became the first female Dean of Columbia University's Mailman School of Public Health, DeLamar Professor of Epidemiology; professor of medicine at Columbia's College of Physicians and Surgeons; and senior vice president of Columbia University Medical Center.

=== Aging research and programs ===
Prior to Fried's work, frailty was an ambiguous medical term commonly referring to a number of ailments and disabilities. Fried developed biologically-based theory regarding the clinical presentation or phenotype of frailty and hypotheses regarding its etiology in dysregulation of genes and some physiologic systems. She has led scientific teams that developed an assessment tool and created a more concrete definition of frailty. Fried also instigated a number of key studies on the cause of frailty and has proposed and developed the idea of a frailty syndrome. Christine K. Cassel, president and chief executive officer of the American Board of Internal Medicine noted that Fried's work, "has become core knowledge and core teaching in every geriatric program" in the country.

In the early 1990s, Fried collaborated with the social activist Marc Freedman and others to design and develop a nationwide volunteer program called Experience Corps. The program trains adult volunteers, ages 55 and older, to improve the academic success of students in economically disadvantaged public elementary schools. Fried and Freedman codesigned the program to have a social impact with children and schools and as a public health intervention to improve the health of older-adult volunteers. A 2009 study using functional magnetic resonance imaging showed that participants experienced short-term gains in executive cognitive function compared with a control group. The program now exists in 19 cities across the United States under the aegis of AARP.

In 2012, The New York Times included her as one of 15 world leaders in science.

=== Mailman School of Public Health ===
As dean, Fried led a major redesign of the School's MPH curriculum to reflect a new emphasis on interdisciplinary learning based on a new vision of public health and health preservation and prevention for every stage of life. The revised curriculum, which includes leadership training and case-study based instruction in applying theory to practice, debuted in the fall of 2012. Fried stepped down from her role as dean in 2025, but remains on faculty at the Mailman School of Public Health.

==== Innovations ====
In 2011, she was instrumental in bringing the International Longevity Center, a research and advocacy center on aging that was founded by the late Robert N. Butler, to Columbia University. Fried led the School to build the nation's first program in a school of public health on climate and health and graduate degrees in this field and established the Global Consortium on Climate and Health Education; she launched the Lerner Center for Public Health Promotion, Columbia Public Health Corporate Partnerships, the Program in Global Health Justice and Governance, established a leading program in Data Science for Health. Among many other innovations, Fried has led the school in the creation of research and educational initiatives on obesity prevention, system science, and public health approaches to preventing incarceration.

== Awards and honors ==
Fried is a member of the World Economic Forum's Global Agenda Council on Aging and the MacArthur Network on an Aging Society. She was the co-chair of the 2019-2022 National Academy of Medicine initiative for a Global Roadmap for Healthy Longevity.

- 2001–present, Elected Member, National Academy of Sciences Institute of Medicine
- 2001–present, Elected Member, Association of American Physicians and served as president (2016-2017)
- 2001 Merit Award, National Institute on Aging
- 2011 Silver Innovator's Award, Alliance for Aging Research
- 2011 Enrico Greppi Prize, Italian Society of Gerontology and Geriatrics
- 2012 Silver Scholar Award, Alliance for Aging Research
- 2012 Longevity Prize, Fondation Ipsen
- 2016 Inserm International Prize
- 2018 Lifetime Achievement Award, International Conference on Frailty and Sarcopenia
- 2019 The Alma Morani Renaissance Woman Award, Women in Medicine Legacy Foundation
- 2022 Kober Medal, Association of American Physicians
- 2022 Named "Best Female Scientist" by Research.com

*Present means as of 2023

== Publications ==
Between 2014 and 2021, the top areas of focus in articles in Gerontology (39.67%), Public health (12.73%) and Internal medicine (29.70%).

=== Peer reviewed articles ===
In 2010, Fried was listed as the third most highly cited author in the field of geriatrics and gerontology. Her 2001 paper Frailty in older adults: Evidence for a phenotype, for example, has been cited more than 15,000 times. According to ResearchGate, she has, as of 2023, published 645 publications and has been cited 98,201 times.

Google Scholar lists these as Fried's other most cited articles:

- Frailty Consensus: A Call to Action cited 3675
- Untangling the Concepts of Disability, Frailty, and Comorbidity: Implications for Improved Targeting and Care cited 4609
- Clinical Practice Guidelines and Quality of Care for Older Patients With Multiple Comorbid Diseases cited 3067
- The cardiovascular health study: Design and rationale cited 2364
- Frailty: implications for clinical practice and public health cited 1160

=== Books and book chapters ===
Partial list:

- Measuring Loss of Homeostasis in Aging ISBN 978-3-319-96660-1
- Etiological Role of Aging in Chronic Diseases: From Epidemiological Evidence to the New Geroscience ISBN 978-3-319-23245-4
- Experience Corps^{®}: A Civic Engagement-Based Public Health Intervention in the Public Schools ISBN 978-1-4419-0635-9
- Inflammatory Markers and Frailty ISBN 978-1-4020-9062-2
- Organizational Change to Support Success of Women ISBN 978-0-306-47351-7
