= Anthony J. Celebrezze =

American judge (1910–1998)

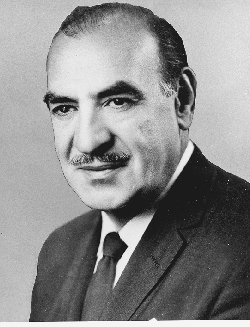

Senior Judge of the United States Court of Appeals for the Sixth Circuit
- In office October 1, 1980 – October 29, 1998

Judge of the United States Court of Appeals for the Sixth Circuit
- In office August 19, 1965 – October 1, 1980
- Appointed by: Lyndon B. Johnson
- Preceded by: Lester LeFevre Cecil
- Succeeded by: Leroy John Contie Jr.

5th United States Secretary of Health, Education, and Welfare
- In office July 31, 1962 – August 17, 1965
- President: John F. Kennedy; Lyndon B. Johnson
- Preceded by: Abraham Ribicoff
- Succeeded by: John W. Gardner

49th Mayor of Cleveland
- In office January 1, 1954 – December 31, 1961
- Preceded by: Thomas A. Burke
- Succeeded by: Ralph S. Locher

19th President of the United States Conference of Mayors
- In office 1962
- Preceded by: W. Haydon Burns
- Succeeded by: Richard C. Lee

31st President of the National League of Cities
- In office 1959
- Preceded by: George Christopher
- Succeeded by: Raymond Tucker

Member of the Ohio State Senate
- In office 1951-1953
- Preceded by: Howard Metzenbaum

Personal details
- Born: Antonio Giuseppe Cilibrizzi; September 4, 1910 Anzi, Basilicata, Kingdom of Italy
- Died: October 29, 1998 (aged 88) Cleveland, Ohio, U.S.
- Party: Democratic
- Children: Anthony J. Celebrezze Jr.
- Education: Claude W. Pettit College of Law (LLB)

Anthony Joseph Celebrezze Sr. (born Antonio Giuseppe Cilibrizzi, Italian: [anˈtɔːnjo dʒuˈzɛppe tʃiliˈbrittsi]; September 4, 1910 – October 29, 1998) was an American politician of the Democratic Party, who served as the 49th mayor of Cleveland, Ohio, as a cabinet member in the Kennedy and Johnson administrations, and as a United States circuit judge of the United States Court of Appeals for the Sixth Circuit.

== Early life and education ==
Celebrezze was born in 1910 as one of thirteen children to Dorothy (née Marcogiuseppe) and Rocco Cilibrizzi in Anzi, a town in the administrative region of Basilicata, southern Italy. The family moved to the United States when he was two years old, and the surname was Americanized in spelling to "Celebrezze." /sɛləˈbriːzi/. After having been a shepherd in Anzi, the father Rocco took an industrial job, becoming a track laborer for the Wheeling and Lake Erie Railroad in Cleveland.

Like many of his immigrant generation, Anthony Celebrezze took odd jobs as a youngster, shining shoes and selling newspapers. He attended Cleveland Public Schools, graduating from Central High School and Fenn College (later developed as Cleveland State University).

He graduated from John Carroll University in 1934. During his college years, he earned his way by working as a railroad laborer and freight truck driver, as well as boxer. He later attended Ohio Northern University in Ada, Ohio, where he received a Bachelor of Laws in 1936 from the Claude W. Pettit College of Law (then known as the Warren G. Harding College of Law).

== Marriage, World War II, and career ==
Celebrezze began working for the Ohio Unemployment Commission in Columbus, Ohio. In 1938, he passed the bar and returned to Cleveland, where he entered the general practice of law. That same year, he married Anne M. Marco, a graduate of Western Reserve University and a teacher in the Cleveland Public School system, on May 7, 1938. With the onset of World War II, Celebrezze enlisted in the United States Navy. Upon his discharge at the end of the war, he returned to private practice.

== Political career ==
In 1950, Celebrezze ran for a seat in the Ohio State Senate, vacated by Howard Metzenbaum, and won. He served as an Ohio state senator from 1951 to 1953. One of the few Democrats to serve in the Senate at the time, Celebrezze cultivated a friendly relationship with the Republican majority. Governor Frank J. Lausche, a Democrat and former mayor of Cleveland, did not have a good relationship with the Democratic leadership in the Senate. Lausche thus relied heavily on Celebrezze to represent his interests in the Senate.

In 1952, when Celebrezze sought re-election to the state senate, he ran into trouble when he crossed the Democratic party chairman, Ray T. Miller, by supporting fellow Italian American Michael DiSalle for the United States Senate instead of James M. Carney. Celebrezze was renominated by his party and won the general election. Six years later in his gubernatorial campaign, he ran against DiSalle.

=== Mayor of Cleveland ===
In 1952, after continuing battles with the Democratic leadership in the Senate, Celebrezze resigned to run for Mayor of Cleveland. The office was open because sitting mayor Thomas A. Burke had decided not to seek another term. The Democratic party organization chose Albert S. Porter, Engineer of Cuyahoga County, to succeed Burke. Although lacking support from Party Chairman Miller, Celebrezze had the backing of Governor Lausche. Mayor Burke did not favor either candidate.

In the open primary among Porter, Celebrezze, and Republican juvenile court Judge William J. McDermott, Celebrezze won a decisive victory, having a substantial lead over McDermott. Porter came in third. In the general election, Celebrezze again defeated Republican McDermott. He was endorsed by the Cleveland Press editor Louis B. Seltzer.

After that, Celebrezze was elected for an unprecedented five two-year terms as mayor, serving from 1953 to 1962. At the time, Cleveland was the fifth-largest city in the nation. Celebrezze drove efforts to build or upgrade the city's infrastructure, and conducted a massive $140 million urban-renewal program. Major portions of the rapid-transit system were constructed during this time, most notably the Red Line, which connected much of the city to the existing Blue and Green lines. There was also extensive work done on the city's freeway system, the Port of Cleveland, and Burke Lakefront Airport.

In 1958 Celebrezze was elected president of the American Municipal Association (now the National League of Cities) in 1958. That same year, he sought the Democratic nomination for Governor of Ohio, but lost to Michael DiSalle. In 1960, he launched the Erieview urban renewal plan, designed by architect I. M. Pei. The most prominent result of the plan was the Erieview Tower. He also spurred several building projects, most notably a federal office building (which was later named after him after his death), and the Garden Valley housing project.

In 1962, Celebrezze served as president of the United States Conference of Mayors.

In 1961, after years of denying rumors that he sought a higher public office, Celebrezze was offered a federal judgeship by President John F. Kennedy, which was a lifetime appointment to a federal judgeship. Celebrezze turned it down to run for a record-breaking fifth consecutive term as mayor, which he won by an unprecedented 73.8 percent, sweeping every one of the city's thirty-three wards. Kennedy appointed him also to serve on the Committee on Equal Employment Opportunity and the Commission on the Status of Women. In 1962, Celebrezze was selected as the president of the United States Conference of Mayors.

=== Cabinet Secretary ===
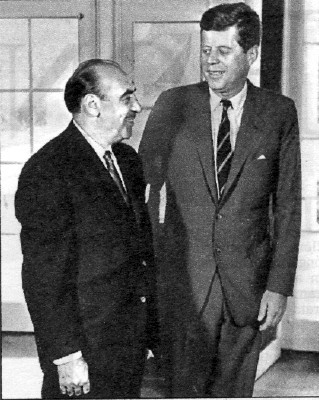
Celebrezze and John F. Kennedy

In 1962, President Kennedy returned to Celebrezze with an offer of a cabinet appointment as United States Secretary of Health, Education, and Welfare (now the Department of Health and Human Services). Celebrezze resigned as mayor in 1962 before his appointment on July 31, 1962. He continued his service under President Lyndon Johnson following Kennedy's assassination in November 1963.

During this time, Celebrezze contributed to the enactment of landmark social legislation, most notably the Civil Rights Act of 1964 and Social Security Act of 1965. One of Celebrezze's most important achievements as secretary of HEW was separating the public assistance and child health and welfare functions from the Social Security Administration, and transferring these programs to a new Welfare Administration. Celebrezze shaped HEW to fit Johnson's initiatives, including getting power from Congress to deny funds for any federal HEW program to any state or institution that practiced racial segregation.

Celebrezze found it difficult to maintain two households on his $25,000 salary and apart from his family, and asked Johnson to return to Cleveland. "We are going to lose the house in Cleveland if I continue to live here, Mr. President," Celebrezze told Johnson. The President replied that Celebrezze was too honest for Washington because he was the first cabinet secretary "to go broke while working for the White House." Celebrezze resigned as HEW Secretary on August 17, 1965.

== Federal judicial service ==
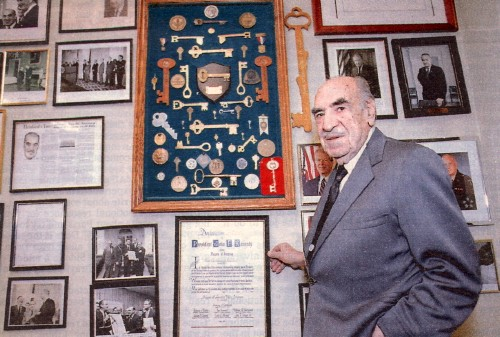
Celebrezze in his old age

Celebrezze was nominated by President Lyndon B. Johnson on July 27, 1965, to a seat on the United States Court of Appeals for the Sixth Circuit, which had been vacated by Judge Lester Lefevre Cecil. He was confirmed by the United States Senate on August 19, 1965, and received his commission on August 19, 1965. After more than fifteen years of service, Celebrezze assumed senior status on October 1, 1980. His service terminated on October 29, 1998, due to his death.

=== Notable cases ===
Celebrezze authored numerous opinions, including Beasley v. United States, which established a fair and progressive standard of "effective assistance of counsel" under the sixth amendment, Hill v. Tennessee Valley Authority, Gabriele v. Chrysler Corp., and Krause v. Rhodes.

== Death ==
In the last three years of his life, Celebrezze was mostly inactive on the court, and spent most of his time organizing his personal papers. In the summer of 1998, he became easily fatigued, and advanced throat cancer was diagnosed about September. He was hospitalized briefly at Lakewood Hospital and at the Cleveland Clinic before transferring to the Corinthian Skilled Nursing Center in Cleveland about October 22, 1998. He died there on October 29, 1998. His funeral was held at the Cathedral of St. John the Evangelist in Cleveland, and he was buried at Holy Cross Cemetery in Brook Park, Ohio.

== Celebrezze political family ==
Celebrezze and his wife Anne had three children: Anthony J. Celebrezze Jr., Jean Ann (Celebrezze) Porto, and Susan Marie (Celebrezze) Sullivan. Anthony Jr. became an attorney and served as Ohio Attorney General; he also ran for governor. The pair are the only father and son to both run as candidates for the Democratic gubernatorial nomination in Ohio. His grandson Anthony J. Celebrezze III (son of Anthony Jr.), also ran for public office.

Celebrezze's older brother Frank D. Celebrezze I (b. 1899) also became an attorney and was active in civic service. He served as Cleveland Safety Director and later was appointed as a Cleveland Municipal Court judge. His descendants also became attorneys and active politically. Frank Celebrezze became Ohio Chief Justice, and James Celebrezze became an Ohio Supreme Court Judge. Frank D. Celebrezze Jr. (grandson to the first Frank) became an Ohio Appeals Court Judge, and Leslie Ann Celebrezze became Domestic Relations Judge of Cuyahoga County Court of Common Pleas.

== Legacy ==
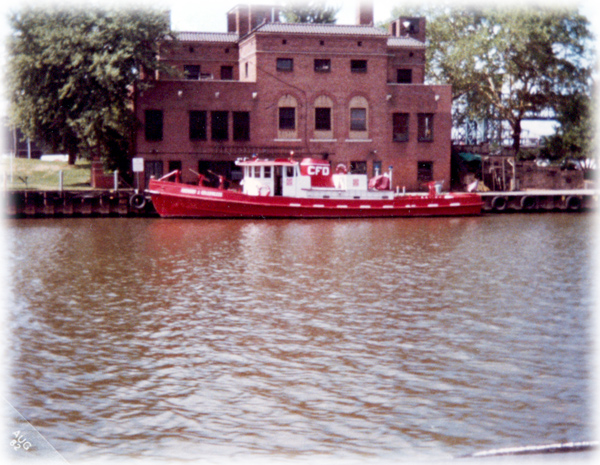
Anthony J. Celebrezze fireboat on the Cuyahoga River

- In 1964, Celebrezze received the Alumni Medal from his alma mater, John Carroll University. In 1978, JCU conferred him an honorary Doctor of Laws degree. He also had honorary degrees from Fenn College, Boston College, LaSalle College, Ohio Northern University, Rhode Island College, Bowling Green State University, Wilberforce University, Miami University (Ohio) and Cleveland State University.
- The federal building in Cleveland is named after Celebrezze, as well as an archives room at Ohio Northern University law school (Ada, Ohio). Additionally, a Cleveland Fire Department fireboat was named after Celebrezze.

== See also ==
- List of foreign-born United States Cabinet members
- Ohio gubernatorial elections

Political offices
Preceded by Thomas A. Burke	Mayor of Cleveland; 1954–1961	Succeeded by Ralph S. Locher
Preceded by George Christopher	President of the National League of Cities; 1959	Succeeded by Raymond Tucker
Preceded by W. Haydon Burns	President of the United States Conference of Mayors; 1962	Succeeded by Richard C. Lee
Preceded by Abraham A. Ribicoff	United States Secretary of Health, Education and Welfare; 1962–1965	Succeeded by John W. Gardner
Legal offices
Preceded by Lester LeFevre Cecil	Judge of the United States Court of Appeals for the Sixth Circuit; 1965–1980	Succeeded by Leroy John Contie Jr.
