= Thomas A. Burke =

American politician (1898–1971)

Thomas Burke
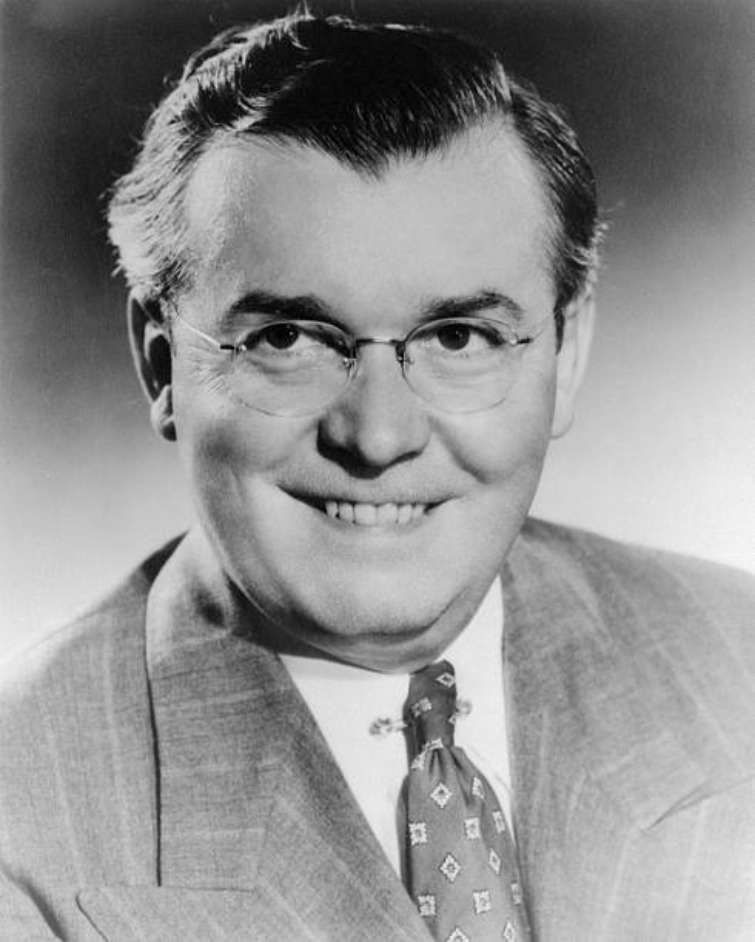
- Burke in 1954

United States Senator from Ohio
- In office November 10, 1953 – December 2, 1954
- Appointed by: Frank Lausche
- Preceded by: Robert A. Taft
- Succeeded by: George H. Bender

48th Mayor of Cleveland
- In office January 4, 1945 – December 31, 1953
- Preceded by: Frank Lausche
- Succeeded by: Anthony J. Celebrezze

11th President of the United States Conference of Mayors
- In office 1953
- Preceded by: Martin H. Kennelly
- Succeeded by: Elmer Robinson

Vice Mayor and Legal Director of Cleveland
- In office 1941–1945
- Mayor: Frank Lausche

Personal details
- Born: October 30, 1898 Cleveland, Ohio, U.S.
- Died: December 5, 1971 (aged 73) Cleveland, Ohio, U.S.
- Party: Democratic
- Education: College of the Holy Cross (BA); Case Western Reserve University (LLB)

Thomas Aloysius Burke (October 30, 1898 – December 5, 1971) was an American politician from Ohio. A member of the Democratic Party, he served as the 48th mayor of Cleveland, Ohio, from 1946 to 1953 and in the United States Senate from November 10, 1953 until December 2, 1954. Cleveland Burke Lakefront Airport is named after him.

== Early life and education ==
Burke was born in Cleveland, Ohio on October 30, 1898. During World War I, Burke served in the United States Army. He graduated from the College of the Holy Cross in Worcester, Massachusetts, with a Bachelor of Arts in 1920 and earned his LL.B. from the Western Reserve University School of Law in 1923.

== Early political career ==
In 1930, Burke became as assistant county prosecutor. In 1937, the Ohio Attorney General, Herbert S. Duffy commissioned an investigation of an election fraud case in Lawrence County, Ohio. Burke was appointed as the special counsel to prosecute the case of six people accused of breaking into the election board and tampering with votes for the county commissioner's race. In 1941, Burke became vice mayor of Cleveland. He was also simultaneously the Director of Law for Cleveland, the city's chief legal advisor.

== Mayoralty ==
With the election of Mayor Frank Lausche as governor of Ohio in 1944, Burke was first in the line of succession to replace him, and therefore became mayor on January 4, 1945. Burke has to stand for re-election in his own right later in 1945, defeating Ray C. Miller with nearly 68% of the vote.

In 1947, Burke faced off against Eliot Ness, the former Treasury agent who pursued Al Capone and later became the Cleveland Director of Public Safety. Despite Ness’ fame, Burke won re-election in a second landslide with more than 66% of the vote and a majority of more than 80,000 votes. Burke went on to win two more times, in 1949 and 1951.

In 1947, the United States Army Corps of Engineers completed a retaining wall and landfill, the city completed work on a 3,600-foot dirt runway and opened its new downtown airport to air traffic. Burke was credited with improvements at the site over the years and, in 1960, Municipal Airport was renamed Burke Lakefront for the former mayor.

In 1953, Burke served as the president of the United States Conference of Mayors.

== U.S. Senate ==
On October 12, 1953, Governor Frank Lausche appointed Burke to succeed Robert A. Taft, who died of cancer on July 31, 1953, in the United States Senate. Burke took Taft's seat on November 10, after his term as mayor ended. Burke ran against George H. Bender in the 1954 special election to serve out the remainder of Taft's term. Burke was defeated by only 7,070 votes and demanded a recount, which narrowed Bender's margin, but did not overturn the results. After his defeat, Burke resumed the practice of law forming the influential Cleveland law firm of Burke, Haber and Berick (now McDonald Hopkins Burke and Haber).

== Personal life ==
Burke was married to Josephine (Lyon) Burke and had two daughters. He died of undisclosed causes on December 5, 1971, at St. Vincent Charity Medical Center in Cleveland, where he'd been admitted the day before. He was buried at Calvary Cemetery in Cleveland.

Party political offices
Preceded by Joseph T. Ferguson	Democratic nominee for U.S. Senator from Ohio (Class 3); 1954	Succeeded by Frank Lausche
Political offices
Preceded by Frank J. Lausche	Mayor of Cleveland; 1946–1953	Succeeded by Anthony J. Celebrezze
U.S. Senate
Preceded by Robert A. Taft I	U.S. senator (Class 3) from Ohio; 1953–1954; Served alongside: John W. Bricker	Succeeded by George H. Bender
