= James Celebrezze =

American judge and politician (1938–2021)

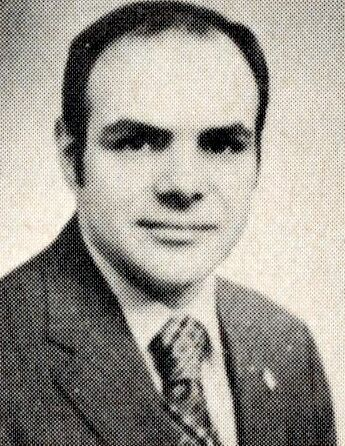

Member of the Ohio House of Representatives from the 4th district
- In office January 3, 1967 – December 31, 1974
- Preceded by: At-Large District
- Succeeded by: Rocco Colonna

Personal details
- Born: February 6, 1938 Cleveland, Ohio
- Died: February 10, 2021 (aged 83) Cleveland, Ohio
- Party: Democratic

James Patrick Celebrezze (February 6, 1938 – February 10, 2021) was an American politician and jurist of the Ohio Democratic party, who served as a judge of the Cuyahoga County, Ohio, common pleas court (domestic relations division). His daughter, Leslie Celebrezze, was elected to fill his seat after his retirement.

Celebrezze served in the Ohio House of Representatives from 1963 to 1973 and was a Democrat.

Celebrezze was elected a judge of the Ohio Supreme Court in 1982, defeating Republican Blanche Krupansky. He was defeated in his bid for re-election in 1984 by J. Craig Wright. His campaign was negatively affected by charges made against the chief justice, Celebrezze's brother Frank Celebrezze.

Celebrezze was the son of Mary Carmella Delsander and Cleveland politician Frank D. Celebrezze I, the nephew of former Johnson cabinet member Anthony Celebrezze, the first cousin of former gubernatorial candidate Anthony J. Celebrezze Jr., the brother of Ohio Chief Justice Frank Celebrezze, the uncle of Ohio appeals court Judge Frank D. Celebrezze Jr., and the first cousin once removed of Anthony J. Celebrezze III.

Two of Celebrezze's three children have recently begun their political careers: daughter Leslie Ann Celebrezze, formerly a Magistrate for Cleveland Municipal Court, is now a judge on the Cuyahoga County Domestic Relations bench. His youngest son, Nicholas J. Celebrezze, served as a Councilman in the city of Parma, Ohio and served as the State Representative from the 15th District in the Ohio House of Representatives. Nick Celebrezze and his father worked together as practicing attorneys in the Celebrezze Group, LLC. His first son, James Celebrezze, currently is employed at a Pittsburgh hospital as head colorectal surgeon.

Celebrezze graduated from Ohio State University with a bachelor of arts in history and political science and Cleveland–Marshall College of Law. He served in the United States Naval Reserve as a military judge and was commissioned a commander. He died on February 10, 2021, in Cleveland, Ohio, at age 83, four days after his birthday.
