= Frank D. Celebrezze I =

American judge (1899–1953)

Frank D. Celebrezze I (May 12, 1899 – August 21, 1953) was an Italian-American politician, judge and former public safety director in Cleveland, Ohio.

== Early life ==
He was born in 1899 to Dorothy (née Marcogiuseppe) and Rocco Cilibrizzi, Italian immigrants in Cleveland. Celebrezze and some of his family spent part of his childhood in his parents' home region of Basilicata, in southern Italy. The family name was Americanized in spelling to Celebrezze after they returned to Cleveland in 1912. His brother Anthony J. Celebrezze was then two years old. One of 13 children, Celebrezze graduated from East Technical High School and St. Ignatius College in Cleveland. (This was later developed as separate campuses for Saint Ignatius High School in Cleveland and John Carroll University in University Heights, Ohio). He earned a Juris Doctor from University of Notre Dame on February 23, 1925.

His brother Anthony also became an attorney. He was elected to several terms as mayor of Cleveland, and was appointed to the cabinet of President John F. Kennedy, continuing in office under President Lyndon B. Johnson.

== Professional ==
In the 1930s, Celebrezze served the courts as a Cuyahoga County assistant prosecutor. In 1942, Celebrezze replaced Eliot Ness as city safety director, serving under Cleveland mayors Frank Lausche and Thomas A. Burke. He was elected as a municipal judge in 1947 and reelected in 1951, serving until his death in 1953.

== Personal ==
Celebrezze married Mary Carmella Delsander, with whom he had six children: Frank D. Celebrezze, Jr., Gerald, Dorothy, Joanne, Monica, and James. Frank Jr. became an attorney and was elected to the Supreme Court of Ohio, where he advanced to serve as Chief Justice. Celebrezze is interred in Holy Cross Cemetery (Brook Park, Ohio) in Brook Park, on Cleveland's West Side.
