= Frank Celebrezze =

American judge (1928–2010)

Chief Justice of the Ohio Supreme Court
- In office 1978–1986
- Preceded by: Robert E. Leach (interim)
- Succeeded by: Thomas J. Moyer

Associate Justice of the Ohio Supreme Court
- In office 1972–1977
- Preceded by: Thomas J. Moyer
- Succeeded by: Robert E. Holmes

Frank D. Celebrezze (November 13, 1928 – March 21, 2010) was an American politician and jurist. A member of the Democratic Party, he served as Chief Justice of the Ohio Supreme Court from 1978 to 1986.

== Career ==
Celebrezze was elected as a judge of the Ohio Supreme Court in 1972, defeating Republican Robert E. Leach. He was re-elected in 1974, defeating Republican Sheldon A. Taft. Celebrezze also was elected to and served in the Ohio State Senate.

In 1978, he was elected as Chief Justice of the Ohio Supreme Court, defeating Republican Thomas M. Herbert. Celebrezze was re-elected chief justice in 1980, defeating Sara J. Harper.

In 1986, Celebrezze was defeated in a bid for another term as chief justice by Thomas J. Moyer. The race between Celebrezze and Moyer was fierce, with Moyer's campaign accusing Celebrezze of having links to organized crime. That year Celebrezze brought a successful libel suit against The Plain Dealer of Cleveland, based on an article that alleged that Celebrezze's campaign had accepted contributions from groups with organized crime connections.

In 1994, Celebrezze ran for a seat on the Ohio Court of Appeals for the Eighth District; he lost to common pleas court Judge Terrence O'Donnell.

== Family ==
Celebrezze was the son of Cleveland politician Frank D. Celebrezze I and the nephew of Anthony Celebrezze, who served in the cabinets of Presidents Kennedy and Johnson as Secretary of the Department of Health, Education and Welfare. His first cousin, Anthony J. Celebrezze Jr., was an elected official and candidate for Ohio governor. His brother, James P. Celebrezze, also served on the Ohio Supreme Court.

== Notes ==
Political offices
| Preceded by Robert E. Leach (interim) | Chief Justice of the Ohio Supreme Court; 1978–1986 | Succeeded by Thomas J. Moyer |
