= DWF Labs =

Cryptocurrency market maker and Web3 investment firm

- Type: Private
- Industry: Cryptocurrency, financial services
- Founded: 2022
- Founder: Andrei Grachev
- Headquarters: Dubai, United Arab Emirates
- Area served: Worldwide
- Parent: Digital Wave Finance
- Website: www.dwf-labs.com

DWF Labs is a private company involved in trading, market making, and investing in cryptocurrency, based in Dubai. The company has been the subject of multiple allegations concerning wash trading and market manipulation.

== History ==
DWF Labs was founded in 2022 by Russian entrepreneur Andrei Grachev as the client-facing affiliate of high-frequency trading firm Digital Wave Finance. The company is headquartered in Dubai, United Arab Emirates. It provides liquidity services, over-the-counter (OTC) trading, options and token investment deals to blockchain projects, and trades on numerous centralized and decentralized exchanges.

The company participated in the Industry Recovery Initiative (IRI), a fund established in 2022 by Binance to finance promising startups affected by the crash of the FTX crypto exchange; DWF Labs initially committed $15 million to the IRI.

== Criticism and controversies ==
In 2024, The Wall Street Journal reported that Binance's internal market-surveillance team had investigated DWF Labs after complaints from other market maker firms and concluded that the firm engaged in extensive wash trading and other price-manipulation practices on the exchange in 2023. According to the report, the team alleged that DWF Labs conducted over $300 million in wash trades and manipulated the prices of Yield Guild Games (YGG) and at least six other tokens, behaviour that would violate Binance's terms of service.
