= Coinmarketcap =

Cryptocurrency information website

CoinMarketCap
- Founded: 2013
- Country of origin: United States
- Area served: Worldwide
- Owner: Binance
- Founder: Brandon Chez
- Industry: Cryptocurrency, Blockchain
- Website: coinmarketcap.com

CoinMarketCap is a website that provides information and data such as prices, trade volumes, market capitalization on cryptocurrencies. It was founded in 2013 in New York City by Brandon Chez.

== Overview ==
Coinmarketcap was founded in 2013 by IT programmer Brandon Chez in New York City. By 2018, the website had become one of the most popular in the world, according to The Wall Street Journal.

In January 2018, Coinmarketcap took out South Korean exchanges from its calculation for prices because the prices there were consistently higher than in other regions. That caused a significant decline in XRP's market capitalization and created chaos on the markets.

According to Bloomberg, in November 2019, Coinmarketcap introduced a Liquidity metric designed to combat fake trading volume.

In April 2020, Binance, a cryptocurrency exchange, acquired Coinmarketcap for an undisclosed amount. Forbes suggested that the deal could be worth $400 million.

In November 2021, Coinmarketcap was cited by Vice, The New York Times and some other media for warning users of the "Squid" coin fraud scheme, which falsely claimed to be affiliated with the Squid Game TV show. The website is also a source for crypto exchanges rankings.

In a letter to The Wall Street Journal, Chez explained that the Coinmarketcap delisted Korean exchanges because many users complained about the inaccurate prices; however, he did not expect the effect of the Korean exchange exclusion to be so large.
