= Squid (disambiguation) =

A squid is a type of marine cephalopod with ten limbs.

Squid or squids may also refer to:

== Arts, entertainment, and media ==
- Squid (band), a post-punk band from Brighton, England
- Squid (DC Comics), a fictional character from DC Comics
- Squid (Marvel Comics), a villain from Marvel Comics
- Squid, a fictional character (villain) from Universal Soldier: The Return
- "Squid" (song), by Paul McCartney from Flaming Pie
- SQUID, a fictional form of virtual reality unit in the film Strange Days
- Squids (video game)
- Squid (game), children's game in Korea
- Squid Game, Korean television show

== Other uses ==
- SQUID (cryptocurrency), cryptocurrency scam based on Squid Game
- Squid (software), a proxy server and web cache
- Squid (weapon), an anti-submarine weapon
- SQUID, a superconducting loop used to make sensitive measurements of magnetic fields
- Squid as food, squid prepared as food

== See also ==
- Giant squid (disambiguation)
