= Binance =

International cryptocurrency exchange

Binance Holdings Ltd.
- Type: Private
- Industry: Cryptocurrency
- Founded: July 2017; 9 years ago
- Founders: Changpeng Zhao; Yi He
- Area served: Worldwide
- Key people: Richard Teng, Yi He (co-CEOs)
- Products: Cryptocurrency exchange, cryptocurrencies
- Revenue: US$12 billion (2022)
- Number of employees: 5,000 (2025)
- Subsidiaries: Sakura Exchange; Trust Wallet; Binance Charity
- Website: binance.com; binance.us (United States)

Binance Holdings Ltd., branded Binance, is the largest cryptocurrency exchange in terms of daily trading volume of cryptocurrencies. Binance was founded in 2017 by Changpeng Zhao. It was initially based in China, then moved to Japan, subsequently left Japan for Malta, and now has no official company headquarters.

Binance has been the subject of lawsuits and challenges from regulatory authorities. As a result, it has been banned from operating or ordered to cease operations in some countries, and has been issued fines. On 21 November 2023, Binance pleaded guilty to violating U.S. anti–money laundering rules and paid a $4.3 billion fine. The United Kingdom's Financial Conduct Authority ordered Binance to stop all regulated activity in the UK in June 2021. In March 2025, The Wall Street Journal uncovered that the company was in talks with Donald Trump's family about business dealings. In August 2025, The Wall Street Journal found that Binance was quietly administering a trading platform for the Trump family's World Liberty Financial. The company paid lobbyists $800,000 to lobby for a pardon for Zhao from President Trump, which was granted in October 2025.

Binance pledged zero tolerance for illicit activities on the exchange in 2023, but investigative journalists have found that it continues to profit from money laundering for organized crime groups and sanctioned entities. Internal investigators at Binance found evidence that Russia and Iran, two sanctioned states, continued to use Binance accounts to move money; after reporting these suspicious transactions to Binance leadership, the internal investigators were fired or suspended. In 2026, The Wall Street Journal reported that Binance was under investigation by the United States Department of Justice for allegedly evading sanctions on Iran-backed designated foreign terrorist organizations such as the Houthis. U.S. federal prosecutors also alleged in an asset forfeiture lawsuit that Chinese companies used Binance to launder the proceeds of oil sales for the Islamic Revolutionary Guard Corps (IRGC).

On October 29 2026, Binance was subject to a $6.3 billion hack, described as the largest digital-asset heist in history and featured unique money laundering patterns.

== History ==
=== 2013–2017: company beginnings and move out of China ===
CEO Changpeng Zhao founded Fusion Systems in 2005 in Shanghai; the company built high-frequency trading systems for stockbrokers. In 2013, he joined Blockchain.info as the third member of the cryptocurrency wallet's team. He also worked at OKCoin as CTO for less than a year, a platform for spot trading between fiat and digital assets. Zhao was hired at this position in 2014 by Yi He, with whom he co-founded Binance several years later.

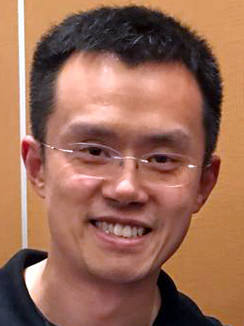
Changpeng Zhao founded Binance in 2017.

Binance was founded in 2017. The company raised about $15 million through an initial coin offering (ICO) that year to fund the launch of the exchange. The company later moved its operations out of mainland China after Chinese regulators began cracking down on cryptocurrency trading in 2017.

=== 2018–2019: launch of stablecoin and security breach ===
In January 2018 it was the largest cryptocurrency exchange with a market capitalization of $1.3 billion, a title it had retained as late as April 2021, despite competition from Coinbase, among others. In March 2018, Binance announced its intentions to open an office in Malta after stricter regulations in Japan and China. In April 2018, Binance signed a memorandum of understanding with the government of Bermuda. Months later, a similar memorandum was signed with the Malta Stock Exchange to develop a platform for trading security tokens. In 2019, the company announced Binance Jersey, a Jersey-based exchange which offers fiat-to-cryptocurrency pairs, including the Euro and the British pound.

In June 2018, Binance and three other firms raised $65 million for sports blockchain company Chiliz. In July 2018, Binance acquired Trust Wallet, a decentralized cryptocurrency wallet for an undisclosed sum composed of a mixture of cash, Binance stock, and BNB tokens. In August 2018, Binance, along with three other large exchanges, raised $32 million to fund the stablecoin project Terra. This was intended to facilitate cryptocurrency transactions with less volatility.

In January 2019, Binance announced that it had partnered with Israel-based payment processor Simplex to enable some cryptocurrencies to be purchased with debit and credit cards. On 7 May 2019, Binance revealed that it had been the victim of a "large scale security breach" in which hackers had stolen 7,000 bitcoin worth around $40 million at the time. Binance halted all transactions for one week while investigating. Binance also pledged to reimburse customers from an emergency fund.

In June 2019, the company announced it would prohibit US passport holders as well as anyone residing in the US, and would set up a new entity binance.us to support those customers. Later in 2023, Forbes leaked a document allegedly from Binance titled "TaiChi" that proposed this regulatory solution to reduce US regulatory risk. Binance subsequently denied the document, sued Forbes for defamation, and subsequently dropped the lawsuit. In September 2019, the exchange began offering perpetual futures contracts, allowing leverage as high as 125 times the value of the contracts. In November 2019, Binance announced it was acquiring Indian bitcoin exchange WazirX, which became disputed in August 2022 when Binance founder Zhao claimed the deal was never signed.

=== 2020–2023 ===
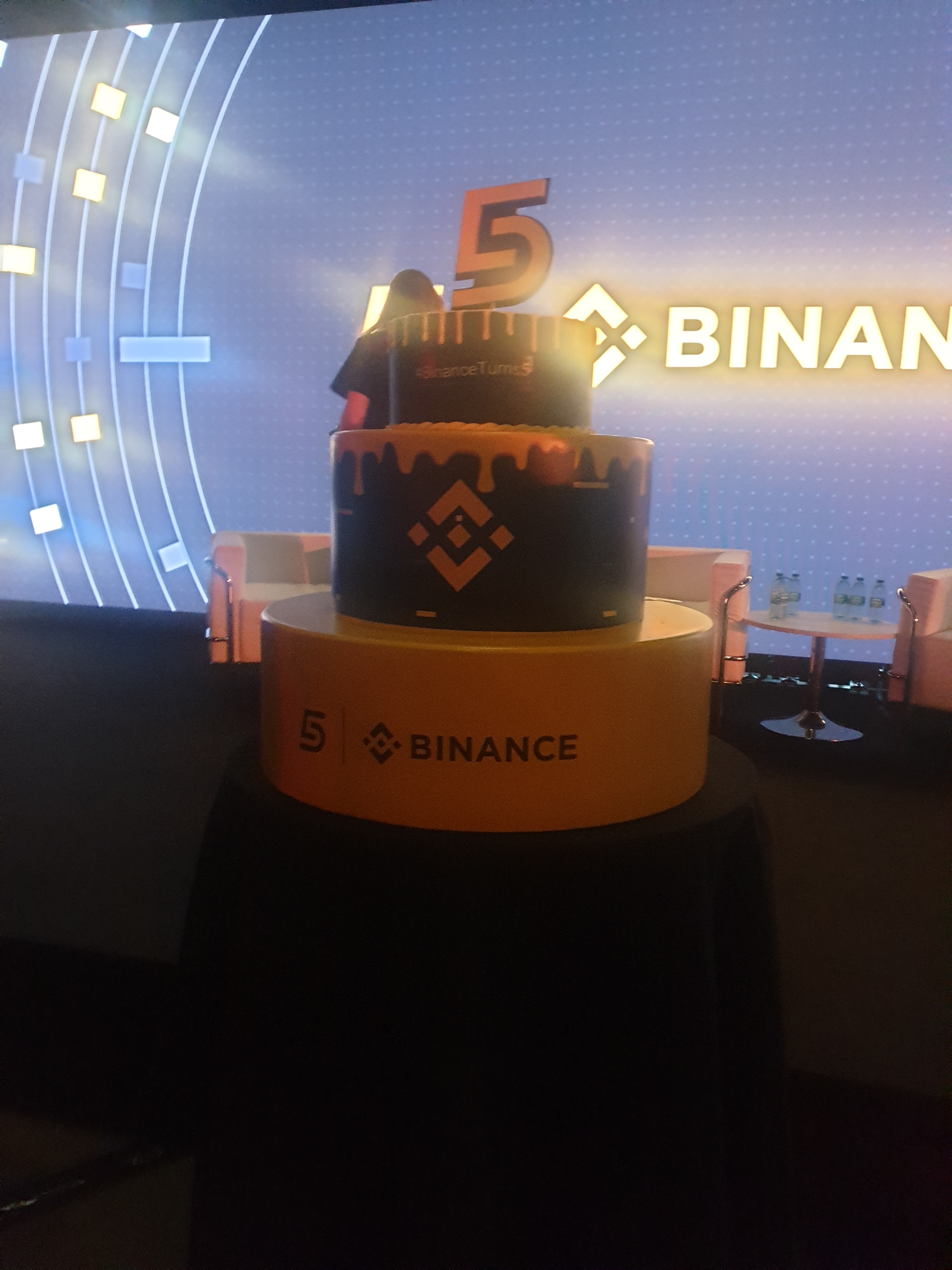
Binance's five-year birthday cake in Paris in July 2022

On 21 February 2020, the Malta Financial Services Authority (MFSA) issued a public statement responding to media reports referring to Binance as a Malta-based cryptocurrency company. The statement noted that Binance "is not authorized by the MFSA to operate in the cryptocurrency sphere and is therefore not subject to regulatory oversight by the MFSA." The MFSA added that it was "assessing if Binance has any activities in Malta which may not fall within the realm of regulatory oversight."

In July 2020, Binance announced a "strategic partnership" with a Chinese state-owned enterprise under the State-owned Assets Supervision and Administration Commission of the State Council and that Binance had joined a group "aiming to facilitate" the Belt and Road Initiative. On 28 October 2020, Forbes staff released leaked documents showing that Binance and its CEO, Changpeng Zhao, created an elaborate corporate structure designed to intentionally deceive United States regulators and secretly profit from cryptocurrency investors located in the country. Binance officially blocks access from IP addresses located in the United States, but "potential customers would be taught how to evade geographic restrictions", Forbes claimed.

In May 2021, it was reported that Binance was under investigation by both the Internal Revenue Service and the United States Department of Justice on allegations of money laundering and tax offenses. In February 2022, Binance took a $200 million stake in Forbes. It's unclear if this investment was ever completed. In May 2022, Forbes Global Media Holdings halted plans to go public via a merger with Magnum Opus Acquisition Ltd, a Hong Kong-based special-purpose acquisition company. Zhao said the plan had "changed a little bit, but I believe that's still in discussions." In February 2023, Zhao tweeted his disappointment that Forbes "continues to write baseless articles" about Binance. In March 2022, amidst the 2022 Russian invasion of Ukraine, Zhao refused to ban users from Russia, citing "financial freedom". Binance later softened the tone of their opposition but not their policy, and also pointed to their donation of $10 million for humanitarian needs in Ukraine.

In 2022, Reuters released several investigative reports on Binance. In January, it documented multiple instances of Binance withholding information from government investigators and business partners and ignoring warnings from its own compliance teams about money laundering risks and poor know your customer compliance. Binance disputed this report's accuracy. In June, Reuters found that Binance had acted as a conduit for the laundering of at least $2.35 billion from hacks, $780 million from the Russian darknet market Hydra, and €800 million from investment scams. The report also found that the Lazarus Group had used Binance to launder funds stolen by North Korea to support its weapons program. Binance disputed these findings. In April, Reuters reported that, in 2021, Binance shared information with Rosfinmonitoring about funds raised by late Russian opposition leader Alexei Navalny's network.

In March 2023, Binance banned Russian residents from buying euros and dollars through its p2p service. In turn, European users lost the ability to buy rubles. In September 2023, Binance announced it was leaving Russia and selling its business to the CommEX platform, which had launched the previous week. Russian users' Binance accounts were able to transfer to the new platform until March 2024. CommEX shut down on 10 May 2024.

On 27 May 2022, Binance announced the registration of its legal entity in Italy and plans to open offices there. At the time, the company was also seeking registration in more European countries, such as Switzerland, Sweden, Spain, Netherlands, Portugal, and Austria. Binance registered to operate in Spain in July 2022 and in Sweden in January 2023. On 13 June 2022, Binance announced that for an unspecified period of time users would be unable to withdraw their funds held in bitcoin, as the value of cryptocurrencies suffered serious declines. Bitcoin withdrawals were allowed to resume later the same day. On October 6, 2022, Binance Coin was hacked, affecting around $568 million in tokens.

Binance invested US$500 million toward the acquisition of Twitter by Elon Musk that was completed in October 2022. After the investment, it announced the creation of a team to work on how blockchain and cryptocurrencies could be helpful to Twitter. On 8 November 2022, Binance offered to buy rival cryptocurrency exchange FTX's non-US operations (FTX.com) to help cover the latter's liquidity crunch. Binance backed out of the deal the next day, citing concerns about FTX's business practices and investigations by US financial regulators. On 30 November 2022, Binance purchased Sakura Exchange. The acquisition allowed Binance to reenter the Japanese cryptocurrency market.

In July 2023, several senior Binance executives resigned. The Wall Street Journal reported that Binance had cut its global workforce by as many as 1,000 staff. CNBC reported that the staff cuts could total 3,000 by the end of 2023. Zhao did not deny layoffs were occurring but said both the reported numbers and the reasons for the senior executive departures were inaccurate. In June 2023, Binance had $790 million in outflows after the SEC announced its lawsuit and Forbes reported that the company had 120 million users globally. On 21 November 2023, a US judge convicted Binance on multiple charges, including violations of the Bank Secrecy Act, money laundering schemes, unlicensed money transmitting, and sanctions violations. As part of the plea deal, the company agreed to pay $4 billion in fines, and Zhao stepped down as CEO with a $50 million fine. He was succeeded by Richard Teng.

=== 2024–present ===
According to a 2024 report in The Wall Street Journal covering 2023, Binance fired several members of its internal investigation team who were tasked with investigating market manipulation such as pump and dump schemes and wash trading. According to The Wall Street Journal, an internal investigation within Binance found that a VIP client of the company, a trading and investment firm named DWF Labs, had previously advertised its ability to manipulate the market by generating "believable" artificial volume to increase the price of tokens. The investigation also found examples of DWF Labs selling tokens its founder had promoted causing a crash in those token's price, which is consistent with a pump and dump scheme, and is against Binance's terms of service. In response to this report, Binance fired the investigators and retained DWF Labs as a client, saying that the self trading could have been accidental and that the internal team collaborated too closely with one of DWF's competitors. Binance has denied any wrongdoing.

According to a 2024 study by John Griffin, a finance professor at the University of Texas at Austin, Binance is the most popular exchange used in pig butchering scams. Binance has occasionally cooperated with US law enforcement to return money lost in such scams.

In November 2024, FTX filed a lawsuit against Binance Holdings Ltd., Zhao, and other Binance executives, seeking to recover nearly $1.8 billion that FTX alleged was fraudulently transferred. The case centered on a July 2021 stock repurchase transaction in which Binance sold its stakes—approximately 20% of FTX's international unit and 18.4% of its US-based entity—to FTX co-founder Sam Bankman-Fried. The lawsuit was one of many filed by FTX against its former investors, affiliates and clients in the bankruptcy court of Delaware. Other defendants included former White House communications officer Anthony Scaramucci, digital-asset exchange Crypto.com and political groups such as the Mark Zuckerberg-founded FWD.US. Nigerian authorities filed a lawsuit suing Binance for $81.5 billion for economic losses and back taxes, alleging the company has a significant presence in the country (despite not being registered), and is therefore liable for corporate income tax.

In 2025, the UAE government's sovereign-wealth fund Mubadala bought a $2 billion stake in Binance. Later that year, in December 2025, Abu Dhabi's financial regulator allowed Binance to operate from Abu Dhabi.

In March 2025, The Wall Street Journal reported that the family of Donald Trump through World Liberty Financial had entered into talks with Binance to acquire a stake in the US arm of the business. This coincided with a push from Zhao to receive a presidential pardon for his felony conviction. According to unnamed sources cited by the Wall Street Journal, Trump advisor Steve Witkoff was involved, although his office denied this. According to the Wall Street Journal, a pardon from President Trump would simplify a revival of Binance's presence in the US.

On March 12, 2025, it was announced that the Abu Dhabi government-backed investment fund MGX Fund Management Limited had made a minority $2 billion investment in Binance.

On October 23, 2025, Trump pardoned Zhao, with White House press secretary Karoline Leavitt saying that Zhao had been the victim of persecution by the Joe Biden administration.

In November 2025, families of victims of the October 7 attacks filed a lawsuit against Binance, alleging that the company helped to transfer funds for Hamas and Hezbollah.

On December 3, 2025 Yi He was appointed as co-CEO. Investigative journalists have found that Binance continues to profit from money laundering for organized crime groups, and sanctioned entities. Internal investigators at Binance found evidence that Russia and Iran, two sanctioned states, continued to use Binance accounts to move money; after reporting these suspicious transactions to hire-ups at Binance, the internal investigators were fire or suspended.

In March 2026, the Wall Street Journal reported that Binance was under investigation by the United States Department of Justice for allegedly evading sanctions on Iran-backed designated foreign terrorist organizations such as the Houthis.

According to the Wall Street Journal, law enforcement agencies have tracked transactions flowing through Binance to networks financing Iran's Islamic Revolutionary Guard Corps (IRGC) as recently as May 2026.

In May 2026, Binance was blocked from operating in the European Union. The exchange started to allow trading of United States stocks and exchange-traded funds in June 2026. The trading option launched with over 7,000 stocks and ETFs. Binance allows purchases with digital currency, such as stablecoins USDC and USDT. Share purchases are facilitated through a broker dealer, Nest Trading, and firm Alpaca.

In August 2026, Reuters reported that Binance had given Russian authorities the identity documents and transaction history of a user who had donated cryptocurrency to the Ukrainian military and to the Azov Brigade, which Russia designates a terrorist organisation. The disclosure came two years after the company said it had left Russia following the 2022 invasion of Ukraine and the Western sanctions imposed in response. Russia's Investigative Committee sent its request to an address Binance lists on its website for Russian and Belarusian law enforcement, and the data it received was used to charge the user with financing terrorism. According to the human rights organization The First Department, the request covered six users who had sent funds to the same wallet, and the material on each was split into a separate criminal case. Binance supplied the user's entire account history, including scans of his Russian passport and Bulgarian residence permit, KYC photographs, balances, deposits and withdrawals, card payments, P2P trades and device fingerprints. Binance said it cooperates with lawful law enforcement requests worldwide and does not comment on individual cases.. Later, in October 2026, a Russian military court sentenced Yuri Belenky to 13 years in prison for financing terrorism over donations traced using data provided by Binance.

In September 2026, in a civil asset forfeiture lawsuit, U.S. federal prosecutors said that Chinese companies used Binance to launder the proceeds of oil sales for the Islamic Revolutionary Guard Corps (IRGC).

==== 2026 hack ====
On 29 October 2026, Binance suffered a major security breach involving cryptocurrency assets valued at an estimated US$6.3 billion marking the largest cryptocurrency theft on record.

Binance temporarily suspended deposits and withdrawals while investigating the incident and coordinating with law enforcement and cryptocurrency issuers. The exchange reported that approximately US$3 billion in affected assets had been frozen with the assistance of industry partners. Stablecoin issuers Tether and Circle froze approximately US$1.57 billion and more than US$800 million, respectively. Ripple also froze approximately US$200 million in related assets.

Binance co-CEO Yi He said the exchange would compensate users for losses resulting from the attack. The company stated that it would use its own financial reserves and its Bitcoin-backed Secure Asset Fund for Users (SAFU), an emergency protection fund valued at approximately US$1 billion, to cover the losses.

== Ecosystem ==
=== BNB ===
Build'N'Build

Denominations
- Code: BNB
- Previous names: Binance Coin

Development
- White paper: BNB Whitepaper
- Initial release: July 2017; 9 years ago
- Development status: Active

Ledger
- Block explorer: bscscan.com
- Supply limit: 200,000,000

Valuation
- Exchange rate: Floating

Website
- Website: www.bnbchain.org

BNB (Build'N'Build) is a coin on the BNB Smart Chain. It was originally called Binance Coin when it was launched in July 2017, for users to pay fees on the company's platform. By 2021, BNB had the third highest market capitalization among cryptocurrencies. The BNB coin was initially a token on the Ethereum network, then moved to BNB Smart Chain when it was released in September 2020.

In February 2022, the company changed the token's name to Build'N'Build. At that time, Binance Smart Chain was also renamed to BNB Chain. BNB Chain had previously been criticized for being overly centralized, which had led to several exploits on the network. BNB had 44 validators as of October 2022.

=== Binance USD ===
Binance USD (BUSD) was a US dollar-pegged stablecoin issued by Paxos on the behalf of Binance starting in 2019. In January 2023, Bloomberg reported that Binance-Peg BUSD "was often undercollateralized between 2020 and 2021. On three separate occasions, the gap between reserves and supply surpassed $1 billion." A Binance spokesperson said the "process of maintaining the backing ... has not always been flawless" but "has been much improved with enhanced discrepancy checks."

In 2022, BUSD became the third largest stablecoin by market capitalization, following Tether (USDT) and USD Coin (USDC). The New York Department of Financial Services issued an order to Paxos to stop minting new BUSD tokens in February 2023.

In a formal statement issued on September 1, 2023, Binance announced it would discontinue support for BUSD.

== Sponsorships ==
Binance sponsored the Africa Cup of Nations, Italian football club Lazio, FC Porto and the Argentina national football team. In 2022, it signed a multi-year agreement with Cristiano Ronaldo to promote non-fungible token collections through its platform. Binance is also taking crypto education to many countries on the continent. In November 2025, Binance pledged HK$10 million to support relief and reconstruction following the Wang Fuk Court fire in Tai Po, Hong Kong.

== Legal status ==
=== Australia ===
On 6 April 2023, the Australian Securities & Investments Commission cancelled the Australian financial services licence held by Oztures Trading Pty Ltd trading as Binance Australia Derivatives (Binance). On 18 May 2023, Binance Australia announced that it had lost access to Australia's PayID payment system "due to a decision made by our third party payment service provider". The same day, Westpac bank banned Australian customers transacting with Binance.

=== Canada ===
On 17 March 2022, Binance has confirmed in an undertaking to the Ontario Securities Commission that it would stop opening new accounts and halting trading in existing accounts for users in Ontario. In May 2023, Binance announced it would withdraw from the Canadian market due to the introduction of stricter rules in the country. On May 30, 2023, it was reported that the Ontario Securities Commission had issued an investigation order into whether Binance may have taken steps to circumvent Ontario securities law and compliance controls prior to its withdrawal from the Canadian market. In May 2024, FINTRAC announced that it had imposed a $4.32 million fine on Binance for violating Canadian money laundering and terrorist financing laws.

=== European Union ===
Under MiCA regulation, crypto-asset service providers (CASPs) in the EU became subject to a single authorisation regime. CASPs already operating under national law before 30 December 2024 may continue during a transitional period until 1 July 2026, or until MiCA authorisation is granted or refused, whichever comes first. In June 2026 Reuters reported that Binance's application for a MiCA licence in Greece was expected to be rejected, citing two people familiar with the matter. If confirmed, this could prevent Binance from continuing to offer crypto services across the EU after the MiCA transition period expires; Binance said it had met the regulatory requirements and had received no formal indication of rejection.

==== Belgium ====
On June 23, 2023, Belgium's Financial Services and Markets Authority ordered Binance to “cease, with immediate effect, offering or providing any and all” virtual currency services in the country. The regulator said Binance had been offering such services “from countries that are not members of the European Economic Area.”

==== France ====
In May 2022, Binance gained regulatory approval in France, allowing the company to provide digital asset services in the country. France is the first European country to give Binance regulatory approval. In June 2023, the Paris prosecutor's office announced that Binance was under preliminary investigation for illegal canvassing of clients and money-laundering. In January 2025, French authorities opened a judicial investigation into Binance for potential involvement in money laundering, drug trafficking, and tax fraud within the European Union from 2019 to 2024.

==== Germany ====
In April 2021, the Federal Financial Supervisory Authority in Germany warned that the company risked fines for not releasing an investor prospectus for the stock tokens it has issued.

==== Italy ====
In July 2021, Italy's Commissione Nazionale per le Società e la Borsa ordered Binance to be blocked from operating. In May 2022, Binance gained regulatory approval in Italy, allowing the company to provide digital asset services in the country. This was the second notice Binance received from the FSA.

==== Netherlands ====
In April 2022, the Dutch central bank announced a €3.3m fine for Binance due to offering services within the Netherlands without being registered in the country. The fine was issued to the company after an official warning was issued to the company during August 2021. In June 2023, Binance announced that it was leaving the Netherlands after failing to obtain regulatory approval.

=== India ===
In August 2022, India's Enforcement Directorate froze the assets of WazirX, an exchange owned by Binance, as part of a money laundering investigation. Following the event, CEO Zhao claimed that they never owned WazirX or owned any equity in Zanmai Labs—the operating entity of WazirX—citing "a few issues" that prevented the completion of the acquisition. The co-founder of WazirX, Nischal Shetty, disputed Zhao's claims asserting that Binance had indeed acquired them.

On 28 December, India's Financial Intelligence Unit recommended blocking the URLs of nine crypto entities, including Binance on the grounds of non compliance to the provisions of the Prevention of Money Laundering Act, 2002 (PMLA). On 12 January 2024, The Binance application was removed from istore and Google Play Store to prevent Indian Crypto investors from using them. In June 2024, Binance was imposed with a fine of US$2.25 million by the Financial Intelligence Unit, for operating in India in violation of local anti-money laundering regulations.

In July 2024, WazirX reported a cyberattack in which approximately US$234.9 million (around ₹2,000 crore) in digital assets were stolen from a multi-signature wallet used under a third-party custody arrangement with Liminal Custody. Global analysis later linked the attack to the Lazarus Group, a North Korea–associated threat actor targeting crypto infrastructures worldwide.

=== Japan ===
On 25 June 2021, Japan's Financial Services Agency warned Binance that it was not registered to do business in Japan.

=== Nigeria ===
In June 2023, Nigeria's Securities and Exchange Commission recently deemed Binance's activities in the country as "illegal". It issued a declaration stating that Binance Nigeria Limited, a subsidiary of Binance, was operating unlawfully in the country. The regulator specifically instructed Binance to cease all its activities within Nigeria.

On 28 February 2024, two Binance executives, Nadeem Anjarwalla and Tigran Gambaryan, were detained by Nigeria's government on allegations of illegal operations and forex manipulation. Anjarwalla escaped custody in March. The Nigerian government subsequently filed a criminal charge against Binance for tax evasion. Amid regulatory issues in Nigeria, Binance disabled its Naira services on 8 March 2024. In May, Binance's CEO, Richard Teng, claimed that officials sought a bribe of cryptocurrency to resolve the issues, but Nigeria's House of Representatives denied the allegations, stating that Binance's actions were an attempt to divert attention from serious criminal allegations against the company. In October 2024, Gambaryan was released after the Nigerian government dropped charges against him.

=== Philippines ===
On Monday, 25 March 2024, the Securities and Exchange Commission (SEC) of the Philippines has moved forward with plans to block Binance's website, citing concerns over the security of Filipino investors' funds. This decision follows the SEC's identification of Binance as operating without the necessary licensing for its investment and trading platform. Despite issuing warnings since November of the previous year, Binance continued its operations prompting the SEC to seek assistance from the National Telecommunications Commission (NTC) in blocking access to Binance's website and affiliated pages.

SEC Chair Emilio Aquino emphasized the potential threat to investors' security posed by continued access to Binance's platform. Despite Binance's significant presence and activity in the Philippines, the SEC aims to provide investors with ample time to transition their investments to authorized platforms. Additionally, the SEC has collaborated with major tech companies like Google and Meta to halt Binance's digital advertising efforts targeting Filipino users, although the Binance app remains available for download on mainstream app stores.

=== Thailand ===
Thailand's Securities and Exchange Commission filed a criminal complaint against Binance on 2 July 2021, "for commission of offence under the Emergency Decree on Digital Asset Business B.E. 2561 (2018)". Additionally, Thailand's SEC cited Binance for operating without a license, a violation of Section 26 of the Digital Asset Businesses Emergency Decree. In May 2023, Thailand's Ministry of Finance issued a cryptocurrency exchange license to Gulf Binance, the joint venture of Binance and Gulf Innova, a subsidiary of Thai billionaire Sarath Ratanavadi's Gulf Energy Development. The exchange would reportedly launch later that same year.

=== United Kingdom ===
In January 2021, the UK's Financial Conduct Authority began requiring firms dealing with cryptoassets to register in order to comply with anti-money laundering rules. In June 2021, Binance was ordered by the FCA to stop all regulated activity in the United Kingdom. In June 2023, the FCA canceled unused permissions granted to Binance Markets Limited, meaning the company "can no longer provide regulated activities and products" in the UK.

In June 2026, a group of 1,700 UK investors brought a class action against Binance and Changpeng Zhao in the High Court of England and Wales, seeking at least £150 million in damages. The claimants allege that the cryptocurrency exchange offered derivatives and leveraged products to UK retail customers without the required regulatory authorisation, causing investors financial losses. In September 2026, it was announced that the claim had grown to 2,700 claimants, with the value of claims estimated to exceed £250 million.

=== United States ===
In 2019, Binance was banned in the United States on regulatory grounds. In response, Binance and other investors opened Binance.US, a separate exchange designed to comply with US federal law. In May 2021, Bloomberg News reported that Binance was under investigation by the United States Department of Justice and Internal Revenue Service for money laundering and tax evasion. In June 2022, the United States Securities and Exchange Commission launched an inquiry into Binance to determine if the company's 2017 ICO of BNB tokens amounted to an illegal sale of a security. In December 2022, Binance's American entity Binance.US announced that it would acquire Voyager Digital's assets in a $1.02 billion deal. This deal was called off in April 2023 due to what Binance.US called a "hostile and uncertain regulatory climate".

Arkham Intelligence provided data in January 2023 that identified "an alleged nexus of money laundering" from a much smaller exchange called Bitzlato through intermediate wallets of Binance. Over several years, it was found that the intermediary wallet deposited $15 million worth of crypto onto Binance's platform. In February 2023, Reuters reported that over the first three months of 2021, Binance transferred over $404 million from a Binance.US account at Silvergate Bank to Merit Peak Ltd., a company Zhao managed. Catherine Coley, then-CEO of Binance.US, was quoted in messages to another Binance executive saying "no one mentioned" the "unexpected" transfers. Coley left Binance.US shortly thereafter. Reuters said the transfers called into question the purported independence of Binance.US from Binance.com. A Binance.US spokesperson said the Reuters report used "outdated information" without further elaboration.

On 1 March 2023, US Senators Elizabeth Warren, Chris Van Hollen, and Roger Marshall wrote a letter to Binance describing the exchange as "a hotbed of illegal financial activity that has facilitated over $10 billion in payments to criminals and sanctions evaders". The letter formally requested documents related to Binance's compliance with regulations. On 27 March 2023, the Commodity Futures Trading Commission (CFTC) filed a lawsuit against Binance and Zhao in the United States District Court for the Northern District of Illinois, claiming willful evasion of US law and allegedly breaching derivatives rules. The agency accused Binance of breaking rules intended to thwart money laundering operations, pointing to internal communications describing transactions by Palestinian militant organization Hamas, and suspected criminals, with the company's money laundering reporting officer allegedly remarking "we see the bad, but we close 2 eyes". In April 2023, three unidentified trading firms cited as VIP clients of Binance were revealed to be Radix Trading, Jane Street Capital, and Tower Research Capital.

In June 2023, the SEC said it was suing Binance and Zhao on 13 charges for alleged violations of US securities rules. On 12 September 2023, Binance.US announced the resignation of CEO Brian Shroder and a reduction of the exchange's workforce by around 100 positions, roughly one-third of its total staff. Binance.US cited the SEC's civil suit as "an unfortunate example" of the agency's "aggressive attempts to cripple our industry". In October 2023, coinciding with the outbreak of the Gaza war, Binance and Tether were described as a source of terrorist funding by US senator Cynthia Lummis and US Representative French Hill, with a letter calling for the Department of Justice to crack down on the exchange.

On 21 November 2023, Binance pled guilty and paid a $4.3 billion fine in relation to violations of the US Bank Secrecy Act, failure to register as a money transmitting business, and the International Emergency Economic Powers Act. It was fined $4.3 billion. Zhao agreed to pay a $50 million fine and step down as CEO of the company, but was allowed to maintain his ownership as part of the deal. On 31 January 2024, US victims of the 2023 Hamas-led attack on Israel and their families sued Binance in Manhattan federal court for allegedly facilitating Hamas's terrorist activities by providing a funding mechanism for Hamas. The plaintiffs include released hostages of Hamas and families of people killed in the attack. In April 2024, Zhao was sentenced to four months in prison after pleading guilty to violating US money laundering laws. In September 2024, he was released from prison. In November 2025, 306 American victims of Hamas's attack on Israel sued Binance in federal court in North Dakota, alleging that Binance and Zhao helped Hamas finance the attack. The venue was chosen because "at least two suspicious transactions went through online addresses in Kindred, North Dakota".

== See also ==
- Bitfinex
- Bybit
- Coinbase
- Kraken
- List of bitcoin companies
- List of cryptocurrency trading platforms
