= BTCC (disambiguation) =

The British Touring Car Championship is a touring car racing series in the United Kingdom.

BTCC may also refer to:

- Baltic Touring Car Championship, a touring car racing series in the Baltic states and Finland
- Beijing Television Cultural Center, a skyscraper in Beijing
- BTCC (company), a cryptocurrency exchange
