= Giant squid (disambiguation) =

Giant squid usually refers to large squid of the family Architeuthidae, particularly Architeuthis dux.

Giant squid may also refer to:

== Animals ==
- Colossal squid (Mesonychoteuthis hamiltoni), a squid in the family Cranchiidae
- Giant warty squid (Kondakovia longimana), a squid in the family Onychoteuthidae
- Humboldt squid
- Robust clubhook squid

== Other ==
- Giant Squid (band), a post-metal, progressive rock band
- Giant Squid (company), a video game development company, developers of Abzû
- "The Giant Squid" (Industry), a 2022 television episode

== See also ==
- Kraken, Norse sea monster
- Cthulhu, Lovecraftian horror monster
- Giant octopus (disambiguation)
- Squid (disambiguation)
- "Giant Squidward", SpongeBob SquarePants season 6, episode 7a (2008)
