= Chiliz =

Blockchain platform

Denominations
- Code: $CHZ

Development
- Original author: Alexandre Dreyfus
- White paper: www.chiliz.com/Chiliz_Corporate-Product-profile-V9.pdf
- Development status: Active
- Developer: Mediarex

Ledger
- Ledger start: October 1, 2018; 8 years ago
- Block explorer: explorer.chiliz.com

Website
- Website: www.chiliz.com//

Chiliz is a blockchain platform developed by Maltese-based sports company Mediarex. The Chiliz blockchain powers the Socios.com platform, which offers "fan tokens" to users, enabling them to participate in polls hosted by the clubs, or receive rewards and promotions. The native token Chiliz is used to buy the fan tokens. Alexandre Dreyfus is the CEO of Chiliz and Beatrice Collet is the managing director.

== History ==
Chiliz was launched in 2018 by Maltese-based sports company Mediarex led by CEO Alexandre Dreyfus. Members of the firm's advisory panel include Dr. Christian Mueller, InFront Sports’ vice president, strategy and business development, and Sam Li, Sina Sports’ head of strategic partnerships; with Perform Group's chief strategy officer of Perform Group, John Gleasure, also a shareholder of Mediarex. Other members of the advisory board are Fnatic's CEO Wouter Sleijffers and Team Vitality's CEO Nicolas Maurer.

In June 2018, Chiliz raised $65 million in a round led by Binance with other reputed names in the industry like OK Blockchain Capital, FBG Capital, Ceyuan Ventures, and Bancor also investing. In March 2021, the company announced it will invest $50 million in an expansion to the United States.

In September 2025, the Chiliz Group announced that they had acquired a 51% majority stake in the European esports organisation OG Esports.

== Fan Tokens ==
=== Background ===
Fan tokens are digital coins created on the Chiliz blockchain that sports organisations provide to users via the app Socios.com. This app allows users to vote on a variety of minor decisions, such as new facilities, kit designs, shirt numbers of new signings, celebration songs, and more. Fan Tokens were first introduced in 2019, with football clubs Juventus and Paris Saint-Germain being the first clubs to launch their official tokens. Sports clubs including Barcelona, Atletico Madrid, Manchester City, Inter, Arsenal, AS Roma, Galatasaray, Flamengo, Corinthians and 60 other teams have launched Fan Tokens through Socios.com.
