= Socios.com =

Blockchain-based fan engagement platform

- Type: Private
- Industry: Blockchain
- Founded: June 18, 2018; 8 years ago
- Founder: Alexandre Dreyfus
- Headquarters: Malta
- Products: Socios.com app
- Services: Marketing and cryptocurrency
- Parent: Chiliz
- Website: www.socios.com

Socios.com is a blockchain-based platform for sports and entertainment organizations to monetize their fan bases. The platform allows users to pay cryptocurrency to participate in polls related to sports teams. The platform is operated by the Mediarex company which was founded in 2018 and is headquartered in Malta. Mediarex also operates the related Chiliz blockchain platform.

== History ==
Socios.com was founded in 2018 by Alexandre Dreyfus. The company's goal was to create a blockchain-based platform that would allow sports and entertainment organizations to monetize their fan bases. The company raised $66 million in a private token sale in 2019.

== Products and Services ==
Socios.com's main product is the Socios.com app, which allows users to buy, trade, and execute voting rights for sports teams. The app also allows users to potentially earn cryptocurrency rewards.

Socios' cryptocurrency tokens have fluctuated in value during high-profile sports events, such as the 2022 World Cup, reflecting a pattern of speculative investment.

== Partnerships ==
Socios.com has partnerships with sports and entertainment organizations such as FC Barcelona, Paris Saint-Germain F.C., Juventus FC, and the UFC.

The company has sponsored the Ballon d'Or since 2021.
