= Yi He =

Chinese business executive (born 1986)

- 何一
- Born: 何英; 1986 (age 39–40); Sichuan, China
- Citizenship: China
- Occupation: Business executive
- Years active: 2014–present
- Employer: Binance
- Known for: Co-founding Binance
- Title: Co-CEO of Binance (2025–present); Head of YZi Labs (2022–present)
- Partner: Changpeng Zhao (2014–present)
- Children: 3

Yi He (Chinese: 何一; pinyin: Hé Yī, née Chinese: 何英; pinyin: Hé Yīng; born c. 1986) is a Chinese-born business executive. She is a co-founder of the cryptocurrency exchange Binance and, since December 2025, has served as its co-chief executive officer (CEO), alongside Richard Teng.

Previously, she served as Binance's chief marketing officer. Since August 2022 she has headed YZi Labs, formerly known as Binance Labs, a venture capital firm and family office associated with Binance co-founder Changpeng Zhao that invests in Web3, artificial intelligence and biotechnology companies.

== Early life and education ==
Yi He was born as He Ying (何英) in a rural village of Sichuan province in 1986. Both of her parents were school-teachers, and she entered primary school at the age of five, finishing near the top of her class. As a teenager, she worked part-time, first as a soft-drink promoter at 16, then for two months as manager of a bedding shop.

In 2006, she moved to Beijing to enroll in an in-service master's program in counselling psychology and obtained a national psychological-counsellor certificate. Finding the market limited, she left the field and spent two years as a class teacher at a private arts college in Lijiang.

== Career ==
Between 2012 and 2014 she hosted programmes such as 美丽目的地 and 有多远走多远 on Travel Satellite TV, as well as 北京新发现 on Beijing Television.

In March 2014, she joined the cryptocurrency exchange OKCoin as vice-president and chief marketing officer, where she launched a billboard campaign in Times Square and recruited engineer Changpeng Zhao to the company.

Leaving OKCoin in 2015, she accepted an offer from Yixia Technology (一下科技) to head marketing for its live-streaming apps 一直播, 秒拍 and 小咖秀. Among other initiatives, she secured a widely viewed live stream with South Korean actor Song Joong-ki that contributed to the company's reported valuation of around US$3 billion. She left Yixia in mid-2017 and later that year co-founded Binance with Zhao.

In 2017 He and Zhao co-founded Binance. According to a report in The Wall Street Journal, she holds at least 10% of a Cayman Islands holding company associated with Binance and exercises broad influence over the firm's marketing and investment operations.

In August 2022, amid what was described as a "crypto winter", Binance appointed He as head of Binance Labs, the company's venture capital and incubation arm.

On 3 December 2025, Binance announced that He had been appointed co-CEO of the exchange, sharing the role with Richard Teng, who became sole CEO in 2023 after Zhao stepped down as part of a settlement with United States authorities over anti-money laundering violations.

== Personal life ==
Yi He is in a long-term relationship with Changpeng Zhao. They have been partners since 2014 and have three children together.
