= Giant octopus (disambiguation) =

Giant octopus is a common name for the genus Enteroctopus.

Giant octopus may also refer to:

- Gigantic octopus, a cryptid
- St. Augustine Monster, a globster mistakenly believed to be a gigantic octopus
- Lusca, suggested to be a gigantic octopus
- Mega Shark Versus Giant Octopus, a low budget monster movie produced by The Asylum
- Oodako, a Toho kaiju that first appeared in King Kong vs. Godzilla (1962), also known as the Giant Octopus

== See also ==
- Haliphron atlanticus, thought to be the second largest octopus species
- Kraken, Norse sea monster
- Cthulhu, Lovecraftian horror monster
- Vampire squid, a seemingly cephalopod related to squid and octopuses that feeds off marine snow
