= FTX =

Bankrupt cryptocurrency exchange

FTX Trading Ltd.
- Type: Private
- Industry: Cryptocurrency
- Founded: May 2019; 7 years ago
- Founders: Sam Bankman-Fried; Gary Wang
- Fate: Filed for Chapter 11 bankruptcy in November 2022
- Headquarters: Nassau, New Providence, The Bahamas
- Key people: John J. Ray III (CEO)
- Products: Cryptocurrency exchange; cryptocurrencies
- Revenue: ▲US$1.02 billion (2021)
- Operating income: ▲US$272 million (2021)
- Net income: ▲US$388 million (2021)
- Number of employees: c. 300 (2022)

FTX Trading Ltd., trading as FTX (Futures Exchange), is a bankrupt company that formerly operated a cryptocurrency exchange and crypto hedge fund. The exchange was founded in 2019 by Sam Bankman-Fried and Gary Wang and collapsed in 2022.

At its peak in July 2021, the company had over one million users and was the third-largest cryptocurrency exchange by volume, and its app was widely advertised as a "safe, easy way to get into crypto". As of November 2022, FTX was the third-largest digital currency exchange boasting an active daily trading volume of US$10 billion and a valuation of $32 billion. FTX is incorporated in Antigua and Barbuda and headquartered in the Bahamas. FTX is closely associated with FTX.US, a separate exchange available to US residents.

Since November 11, 2022, FTX has been in Chapter 11 bankruptcy proceedings in the US court system. Public concern began with rumors of unethical and fraudulent inter-company transfers of client funds. In November 2022 CoinDesk also raised concerns stating that FTX's partner firm Alameda Research held a significant portion of its assets in FTX's native token (FTT). Following this revelation, rival exchange Binance's CEO Changpeng Zhao announced that Binance would sell its holdings of the token, which was quickly followed by a spike in customer withdrawals from FTX.

FTX was unable to meet the demand for customer withdrawals. Binance signed a letter of intent to acquire the firm, with due diligence to follow, to ensure that customers could recover their assets from FTX in a timely manner, but Binance withdrew its offer the next day, citing reports of mishandled customer funds and U.S. agency investigations. On December 12, 2022, founder Sam Bankman-Fried was arrested by the Bahamian authorities for financial offences, at the request of the US government. The current CEO of FTX is John J. Ray III, who specializes in recovering funds from failed corporations.

== History ==
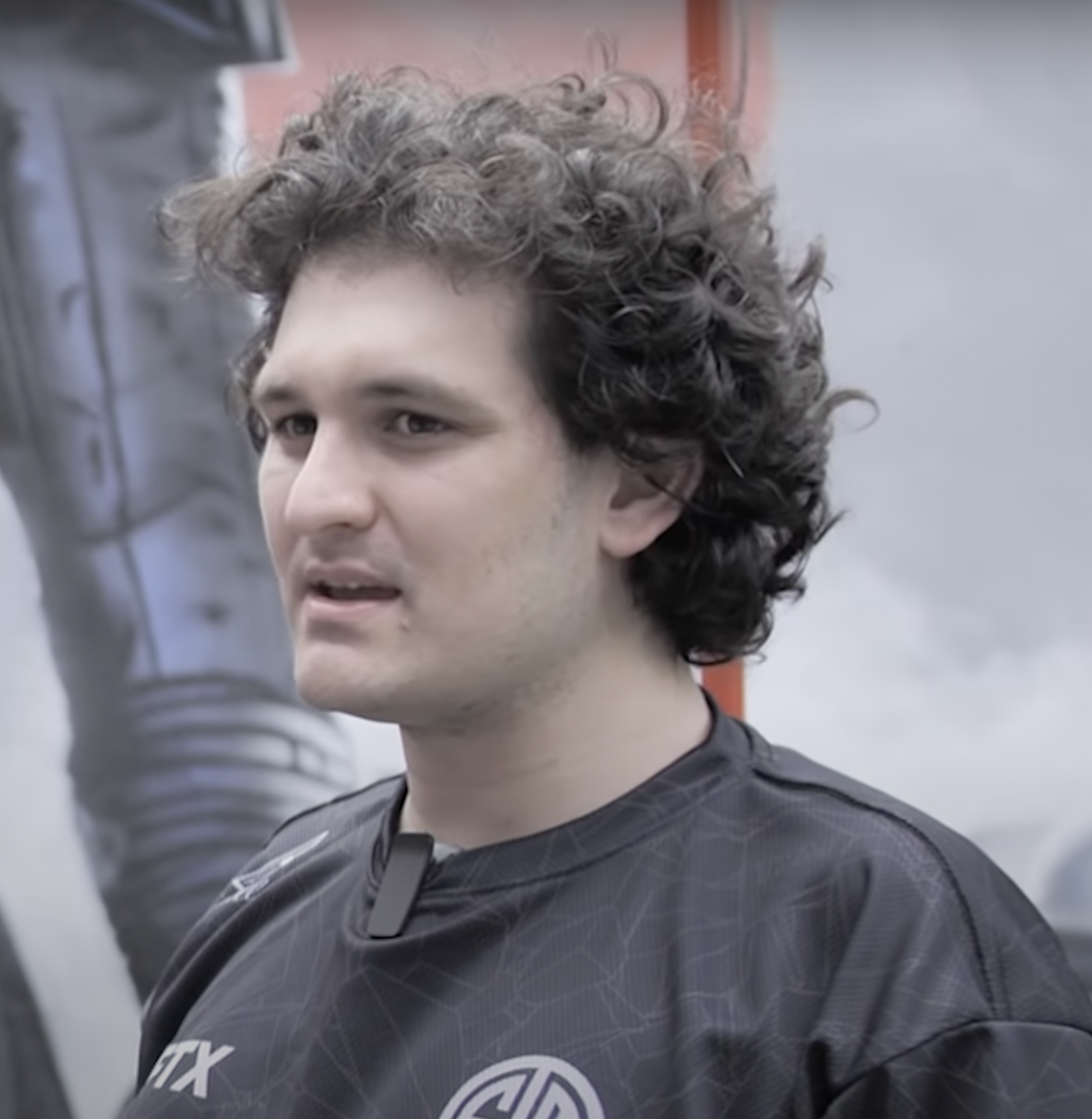
FTX founder Sam Bankman-Fried

Sam Bankman-Fried and Zixiao "Gary" Wang founded FTX in May 2019. FTX began within Alameda Research, a trading firm founded by Bankman-Fried, Caroline Ellison, and other former employees of Jane Street in 2017, in Berkeley, California. FTX is an abbreviation of "Futures Exchange". Changpeng Zhao of Binance purchased a 20% stake in FTX for approximately $100 million, six months after Bankman-Fried and Wang started the firm.

In August 2020, FTX acquired Blockfolio, a cryptocurrency portfolio tracking app, for $150 million. In July 2021, the venture raised $900 million at an $18 billion valuation from over 60 investors, including Softbank, Sequoia Capital, and other firms. Bankman-Fried bought out Zhao's stake for approximately $2 billion. In September of that year, FTX moved its headquarters from Hong Kong to The Bahamas.

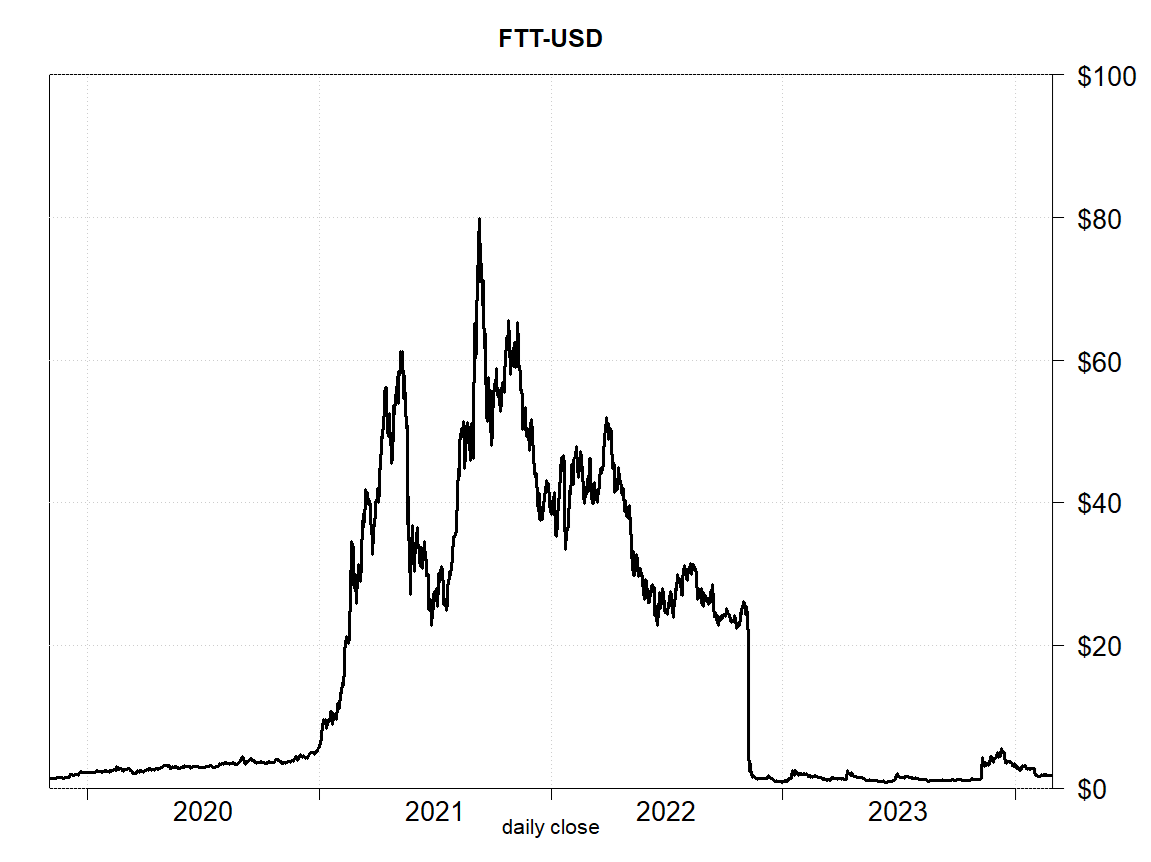
Daily closing price in US dollars of FTT, 2020–2023

On January 14, 2022, FTX announced a $2 billion venture fund named FTX Ventures, raising $400 million in Series C funding at a $32 billion valuation that month. The FTX Ventures website went offline in November 2022. On February 11, 2022, FTX.US announced that the company would soon begin offering stock trading to its US customers.

In February 2022, it was reported that FTX was creating a gaming division that would help developers add cryptocurrency, NFTs, and other blockchain-related assets into video games. In July 2022, FTX finalized a deal giving it the option to buy BlockFi for about $240 million. The deal included a $400 million credit facility for BlockFi.

In August 2022, the Federal Deposit Insurance Corporation (FDIC) issued a cease-and-desist order to FTX for making "false and misleading representations" about deposits being covered by FDIC insurance following FTX president Brett Harrison's tweet implying otherwise. Following the regulatory action, Harrison deleted the tweet and Bankman-Fried clarified in another tweet that FTX deposits are not insured by the FDIC.

On September 26, 2022, FTX.US won its bid at auction for the digital assets of bankrupt crypto brokerage Voyager Digital. The value of the deal was approximately $1.42 billion, including $1.31 billion in Voyager-held cryptocurrency and $111 million in additional consideration. The deal was subject to approval by bankruptcy courts and Voyager's creditors. Following the FTX bankruptcy, in December 2022, the US subsidiary of Binance won the bid to buy the assets of Voyager for approximately $1 billion.

On September 27, 2022, FTX.US President Brett Harrison announced he would be stepping down from an active role at the exchange but would stay on in an advisory capacity. The company did not immediately announce a replacement for Harrison, who had been FTX.US president since May 2021. In October 2022, it was reported that FTX was under investigation in Texas for allegedly selling unregistered securities. In August 2023, it was reported that the company plans to restart offering cryptocurrency trading services after a restructuring of the bankrupt company is completed.

== November 2022 crisis and bankruptcy ==
FTX Token
Denominations
- Code: FTT

Development
- White paper: FTT Whitepaper
- Initial release: May 5, 2019 (7 years ago)

=== Background: FTX and Alameda, Binance, and CoinDesk report ===
In September 2022, Bloomberg reported on the close relationship between Alameda Research and FTX. Bloomberg noted that Alameda had functioned as a market maker for FTX early in the exchange's history, and that the trading firm remained, in June and July 2022, the biggest known depositor of stable coins on FTX. Bloomberg further stated that the regulatory oversight which applies to companies operating in traditional equities markets would have prohibited the relationship between the two firms were it applicable. Alameda's trading on FTX meant the trading firm was potentially in a position to gain financially when others lost money on the exchange. Bankman-Fried defended FTX's use of Alameda as a liquidity provider.

According to John J. Ray III, Alameda had a "secret exemption" from FTX's auto-liquidation protocol. Later, the existence of such an undisclosed beneficial relationship was described by Ray, the new CEO of FTX, as a "complete failure of corporate controls" and indicated gross mismanagement. Between early 2021 and March 2022, Alameda Research amassed crypto tokens ahead of FTX announcing the decision to list them for trading.

According to anonymous sources cited by The Wall Street Journal, FTX had lent $10 billion of its customers' assets to Alameda Research in 2022. Alameda CEO Caroline Ellison disclosed to other Alameda employees that she, Sam Bankman-Fried, Gary Wang, and Nishad Singh knew about that decision. An anonymous source cited by The New York Times said the same. According to the sources cited by The Wall Street Journal, Ellison said the funds were used in part to pay back loans Alameda had taken to make investments. Ray said that FTX used software to conceal the misuse of customer funds.

Several months after Bloomberg's initial report on the relationship between the two firms, on November 2, 2022, CoinDesk reported that a significant portion of Alameda Research's assets were held in FTT, the exchange token issued by FTX. It said that there were $5.1 billion worth of FTT tokens in circulation, and that Alameda's balance sheet held $3.66 billion of "unlocked FTT", $2.16 billion of "FTT collateral", and $292 million of "locked FTT". In the weeks immediately preceding the publication of the story by CoinDesk, Bankman-Fried was characterized by anonymous sources cited by Bloomberg as "desperately" attempting to raise money for FTX. Additionally, Bankman-Fried had been publicly "dueling" with Changpeng Zhao on Twitter in the months preceding the CoinDesk article, in part due to disagreements stemming from their differing views on the regulation of cryptocurrency.

=== Crisis begins: Binance FTT sale, sell-off, and withdrawn rescue bid ===
Several days after the publication of the CoinDesk article, on November 6, Binance CEO Changpeng Zhao said on Twitter that his firm intended to sell all its holdings of FTT. Binance had received FTT from FTX in 2021 during a transaction in which FTX bought back Binance's equity stake in FTX. Zhao cited "recent revelations that came to light" as the motivation for selling FTT. Bloomberg and TechCrunch reported that any sale by Binance would likely have an outsized impact on FTT's price, given the token's low trading volume. The announcement by Zhao of the pending sale and disputes between Zhao and Bankman-Fried on Twitter led to a decline in the price of FTT and other cryptocurrencies, resulting in a three-day depositor sell-off, like a bank run, of an estimated $6 billion that sent FTX into crisis. On November 8, Zhao announced that Binance had entered into a non-binding agreement to purchase FTX due to what he referred to as a "liquidity crisis" at FTX. The deal did not include the sale of FTX.US. Zhao announced on Twitter that the company would complete due diligence soon, adding that all cryptocurrency exchanges should avoid using FTT tokens as collateral. He also wrote that he expected FTT to be "highly volatile in the coming days as things develop". On the day of that announcement, FTT price dropped by 80 percent, erasing $2 billion in value.

On November 9, Bloomberg called the acquisition of FTX by Binance "unlikely" due to the poor state of FTX's finances. Bloomberg also reported that the United States Securities and Exchange Commission and Commodity Futures Trading Commission were investigating the nature of FTX's connections to Bankman-Fried's other holdings and its handling of client funds. Later that day, The Wall Street Journal reported that Binance would not move forward with the deal to acquire FTX. Binance cited FTX's reported mishandling of customer funds and pending investigations of FTX as the reasons for not pursuing the deal. Bankman-Fried said in a Slack message that FTX had learned through the press about Binance's concern and decision.

On November 9, FTX's website said that it was not processing withdrawals at that time. Bankman-Fried said that although the firm's assets were worth more than its clients' deposits, it would need funds from outside to meet demand for withdrawals due to a lack of liquidity. Bankman-Fried stated on November 9 that FTX.US, as a separate company, was "not currently impacted" by the crisis.

=== Bankruptcy and unauthorized transactions ===
On November 10, Axios cited anonymous sources who said that FTX approached Kraken for a potential rescue deal. Bankman-Fried made several statements on November 10, taking responsibility for FTX's failure and indicating that FTX was still seeking capital to remain solvent. Bankman-Fried also announced that Alameda Research would cease trading and end operations. FTX's in-house legal and compliance teams had, for the most part, resigned by November 10. Anonymous sources cited by the Wall Street Journal on November 10 said that Alameda Research owed FTX some $10 billion, as FTX had lent funds placed on the exchange for trading to Alameda so that Alameda could make investments with the money. On November 12, anonymous sources cited by the Wall Street Journal said Alameda CEO Caroline Ellison disclosed to other Alameda employees that she, Sam Bankman-Fried, Gary Wang, and Nishad Singh knew that client deposits were transferred from FTX to Alameda. An anonymous source cited by the New York Times on November 14 said the same. According to the sources cited by The Wall Street Journal, Ellison said the funds were used in part to pay back loans Alameda had taken to make investments.

Though Bankman-Fried, on November 10, wrote on Twitter that FTX's US customers did not have reason to worry, employees began attempting to sell assets belonging to the firm on the same day. These assets include stock-clearing company Embed Financial Technologies and the naming rights to FTX Arena. On November 10, the Securities Commission of the Bahamas froze the assets of one of FTX's subsidiaries, FTX Digital Markets Ltd, "and related parties", and provisionally appointed an attorney as liquidator. Japan's Financial Services Agency ordered FTX Japan to suspend some operations. The company's Australian subsidiary was placed under administration.

On November 10, the team running the FTX Future Fund, an ostensibly charitable group bankrolled by Bankman-Fried, announced that they had resigned earlier that day. Future Fund had committed $160 million in charitable grants and investments by September 1 of that year. Crypto lender BlockFi, which was affiliated with FTX, announced on November 10 that it was suspending operations as a result of FTX's collapse.

On November 11, FTX, FTX.US, Alameda Research, and more than 100 affiliates filed for bankruptcy in Delaware. Anonymous sources cited by The New York Times said that the exchange owed as much as $8 billion. Bankman-Fried resigned as CEO and was replaced by John J. Ray III, a corporate restructuring specialist who'd previously overseen the liquidation of Enron.

Late on November 11, over $473 million in funds were siphoned from FTX through what Ryne Miller, FTX US's general counsel, characterized as "unauthorized transactions". Miller announced that FTX and FTX US intended to move remaining funds denominated in cryptocurrency to offline "cold storage" for security. The funds taken from FTX were mostly stablecoins such as Tether, and were quickly exchanged for Ether, a method used by cryptocurrency thieves to thwart attempts to retrieve stolen funds. A person speaking on behalf of FTX referred to the "unauthorized transactions" as a "hack" and encouraged users to delete FTX mobile apps as they were compromised. Kraken offered to assist in identifying the perpetrator. In January 2024, the U.S. Department of Justice indicted three individuals for running a SIM swap scam operation that allegedly stole “over $400 million in virtual currency” from an unspecified company. Sources told Bloomberg that the company was FTX.

As of November 12, Bankman-Fried told Reuters that he was still in the Bahamas, though other high-ranking FTX employees had begun leaving for Hong Kong, the location of the company's former headquarters, or other locations. Authorities in the Bahamas, including the Royal Bahamas Police Force, questioned Bankman-Fried on November 12. Despite FTX's bankruptcy, Bankman-Fried continued to attempt to raise money for the firm during the weekend of November 12 and 13.

On November 14, Kraken's chief security officer said on Twitter that the firm knew "the identity" of a user who paid transaction fees associated with moving the stolen money through their Kraken account. In an interview with Kelsey Piper published November 16 by Vox, Bankman-Fried blamed an "ex-employee" or malware on a device owned by an ex-employee for the theft.

According to anonymous sources cited by Reuters, between $1 billion and $2 billion in customer funds could not be accounted for as of November 12. The Financial Times reported that FTX's balance sheet shortly before the bankruptcy showed $9 billion in liabilities, with $900 million in liquid assets, $5 billion in "less liquid" assets, and $3.2 billion in illiquid private equity investments.

Bankman-Fried began publishing "cryptic" messages in sequence on Twitter on November 14. As of November 15, the messages all read "What HAPPENED". On November 15, FTX sought to raise $10 billion in liquidity from investors. On November 16, the Bahamas unit of FTX, FTX Digital Markets, officially filed for Chapter 15 bankruptcy protection in the United States.

On November 17, John J. Ray III, the CEO brought in as a liquidator, stated in a sworn declaration submitted in bankruptcy court that, according to FTX's records, its subsidiary Alameda Research had on September 30 lent $1 billion to Bankman-Fried and more than $500 million to FTX co-founder Nishad Singh. Ray, having been involved in the bankruptcies of Enron, Residential Capital, Nortel and Overseas Shipholding, stated, "Never in my career have I seen such a complete failure of corporate controls and such a complete absence of trustworthy financial information as occurred here. From compromised systems integrity and faulty regulatory oversight abroad, to the concentration of control in the hands of a very small group of inexperienced, unsophisticated and potentially compromised individuals, this situation is unprecedented." Speaking to the House Committee on Financial Services, he testified that "literally, there's no record-keeping whatsoever" and that the company used the small-business accounting tool QuickBooks for its accounting needs, despite handling "billions of dollars." In a court filing filed by FTX on May 8, 2024, FTX told that court that most FTX customers would get all their money back and a surplus would be left over.

=== Widening impact and contagion fears ===
The exchange token of Crypto.com, Cronos, lost approximately $1 billion in value in November, a decline attributed in part to the collapse of FTX and in part to reporting that Crypto.com had accidentally sent $400 million of Ether to another exchange. On November 14, Crypto.com's CEO assured users that the exchange was functioning as normal. Commenters and customers remained fearful that Crypto.com could experience a collapse similar to FTX.

BlockFi, a cryptocurrency lender, was reportedly taking steps to file for bankruptcy as of November 15. The firm had earlier begun preventing withdrawals. The company disclosed "significant exposure" to FTX on November 14. Another cryptocurrency lender, Genesis, a subsidiary of Digital Currency Group, halted withdrawals on November 16. This halt caused Gemini, an exchange owned by the Winklevoss twins, to cease allowing redemptions for clients using a service provided through a partnership with Genesis. Another Digital Currency Group subsidiary, Grayscale, saw the value of its flagship offering, the publicly traded Grayscale Bitcoin Trust, decline by 20% over the two weeks preceding November 17. Grayscale Bitcoin Trust was trading at a discounted price, 42% below the value of its Bitcoin, as of November 14.

Concerns have also been raised about Silvergate Bank, as FTX was a depositor and could have also been a source of credit exposure. Silvergate has said that it has ample liquidity and no loan exposure to FTX. These concerns have been magnified due to Silvergate's key role as a gateway between its cryptocurrency clients and the wider financial world.

=== Responses and effects ===
==== Effects on investors ====
Institutional investors that stand to lose money due to their stakes in FTX include Tiger Global Management, the Ontario Teachers' Pension Plan, SoftBank Group, BlackRock, Lightspeed Venture Partners, Temasek, and Sequoia Capital. Sequoia Capital wrote down its equity in FTX to $0 on November 9, losing some $214 million. Sequoia released a notice to investors, also published on Twitter, assuring them the firm's stake in FTX represented a small amount of its overall portfolio, and replaced a profile of Bankman-Fried published on the firm's website with a link to the same notice. The Ontario Teachers' Pension Plan released a similar statement. Temasek later wrote down its investment on November 16. Several public figures also invested in FTX or received compensation for promoting the company. These include football player Tom Brady, basketball players Shaquille O'Neal and Stephen Curry, model Gisele Bündchen, and businessman Kevin O'Leary.

Gisele Bündchen was also appointed the ESG advisor for the cryptocurrency platform. After its bankruptcy, investors sued her for her involvement and accused her of participating in FTX's alleged scheme to take advantage of unsophisticated investors. Anthony Scaramucci, founder of SkyBridge Capital, announced the firm was attempting to buy back a 30% stake in the business owned by FTX.

==== Effects on other cryptocurrency firms and cryptocurrency markets ====
Cryptocurrency investment firms with assets still held on FTX after its bankruptcy include Galois Capital and Galaxy Digital. Cryptocurrencies experienced swings and declines in value as news of FTX's collapse first emerged in early November: Tether dropped below its peg price of $1.00 to $0.97 and Bitcoin sank to its lowest price in two years. Share prices for publicly traded cryptocurrency companies declined. The price of Solana, which was affiliated with Bankman-Fried, declined as well.

The crisis at FTX has inspired an increase in withdrawals from other exchanges. A decline in the value of Cronos, the token of exchange Crypto.com, triggered fears of the potential for a collapse similar to that of FTX and spurred withdrawals from the platform. CEO Kris Marszalek provided assurances that the firm was liquid and that it did not use Cronos in a manner similar to the way FTX used FTT. Bloomberg reported that the collapse of FTX exacerbated institutional skepticism of cryptocurrencies as an asset class. In December, it emerged that FTX had secretly invested in The Block, a cryptocurrency news firm, and to fund an LLC its CEO Michael McCaffrey used to buy an apartment. Its staff said they had no knowledge of the investments. McCaffrey then resigned.

==== Responses and commentary ====
Investment manager and short selling specialist Jim Chanos predicted in November 2022 the collapse of FTX would lead to "increased scrutiny and regulation" over cryptocurrencies. Chanos criticized the cryptocurrency sector as "designed to extract fees from really unsuspecting investors". Richard Handler, CEO of American financial firm Jefferies Group, tweeted on November 10 that he had attempted to meet with Bankman-Fried in July and again in September, as he perceived the FTX CEO was "in over his head". Handler stated that Bankman-Fried did not respond to the emails sent from Jefferies staff on Handler's behalf.

The sudden collapse of FTX has been compared to the bankruptcy of Lehman Brothers in publications such as The New York Times and the Financial Times. Lawrence Summers acknowledged the comparisons to Lehman and further compared the collapse to the Enron scandal, caused by fraud perpetrated by Enron executives. Rostin Behnam, the Chairman of the Commodity Futures Trading Commission, called for Congress to grant the organization more power to regulate cryptocurrencies. The financial impact of the collapse having reached beyond the immediate FTX customer base, financial industry executives said at a Reuters conference that "regulators must step in to protect crypto investors." Technology analyst Avivah Litan commented on the cryptocurrency ecosystem that "everything...needs to improve dramatically in terms of user experience, controls, safety, [and] customer service." Risk management firm Titan Grey published a primer on the commencement and early motions practice of the FTX chapter 11 case, analyzing issues such as creditor privacy, relief from the automatic stay, proposed differential treatment of customers from other creditors, and others.

== Legal process ==
Following the collapse of FTX, the Royal Bahamas Police Force launched a criminal investigation into the company. Anonymous sources cited by Bloomberg said that the office of the United States Attorney for the Southern District of New York had begun an investigation into FTX's collapse as of November 14, 2022. The United States House Committee on Financial Services announced plans to conduct hearings in December on the collapse of FTX, and committee leaders said they would seek testimony from Bankman-Fried. According to anonymous sources cited by The Information, some venture capital firms are considering suing Bankman-Fried.

On December 13, 2022, FTX founder and CEO Sam Bankman-Fried was charged by the US Attorney's Office for the Southern District of New York with fraud, conspiracy to commit money laundering, and conspiracy to defraud the US and violate campaign finance laws. After being extradited from the Bahamas, Bankman-Fried was released on a $250 million bond and ordered to remain under house arrest at his parents' home in Palo Alto, California. He was arraigned in federal court in Manhattan on January 3, 2023, and entered a plea of not guilty to all counts. Judge Lewis A. Kaplan set the trial date for United States v. Bankman-Fried for October 2, 2023, saying he might move it "forward or backward a day or two." Meanwhile, Gary Wang, co-founder of FTX, and Caroline Ellison, who had served as Alameda's CEO, pleaded guilty to multiple charges and began cooperating with federal prosecutors.

Former FTX executive Ryan Salame pleaded guilty to both a campaign finance law violation and a charge of operating an unlicensed money transmitting business. On May 28, 2024, Salame was sentenced to 7.5 years in prison and ordered to pay more than $5 million in restitution and forfeit an additional $6 million. Salame began serving his sentence in October 2024.

On September 24, 2024, Caroline Ellison was sentenced to two years in prison on charges including wire fraud and money laundering. While Judge Kaplan acknowledged the assistance she'd provided to prosecutors, he said her cooperation should not be a “get out of jail free card.”

FTX's former engineering director, Nishad Singh, pleaded guilty to six different charges, including three counts of conspiracy to commit fraud. Singh is a childhood friend of Bankman-Fried's brother and worked at Alameda Research before being brought into FTX. On October 30, 2024, Singh was sentenced to time served and three years of supervised release based on his cooperation with prosecutors and Judge Kaplan's view that Singh's role in the fraud was “much more limited” than that of his colleagues.

On November 20, 2024, Gary Wang was sentenced to time served and three years of supervised release, with Kaplan saying Wang was “entitled to a lot of credit” for his cooperation with prosecutors.

In August 2024, FTX was ordered by a US court to pay $12.7 billion in compensation to former customers and fraud victims. The Commodity Futures Trading Commission called this the "largest such recovery" in their history. The sum consists of $8.7 billion in restitution, and $4 billion in disgorgement.

On October 7, 2024, U.S. Bankruptcy Judge John Dorsey approved the FTX bankruptcy plan which repays customers with balances less than $50,000 their full balance, but with cryptocurrencies valued at the date of the collapse.

== Sponsorships ==
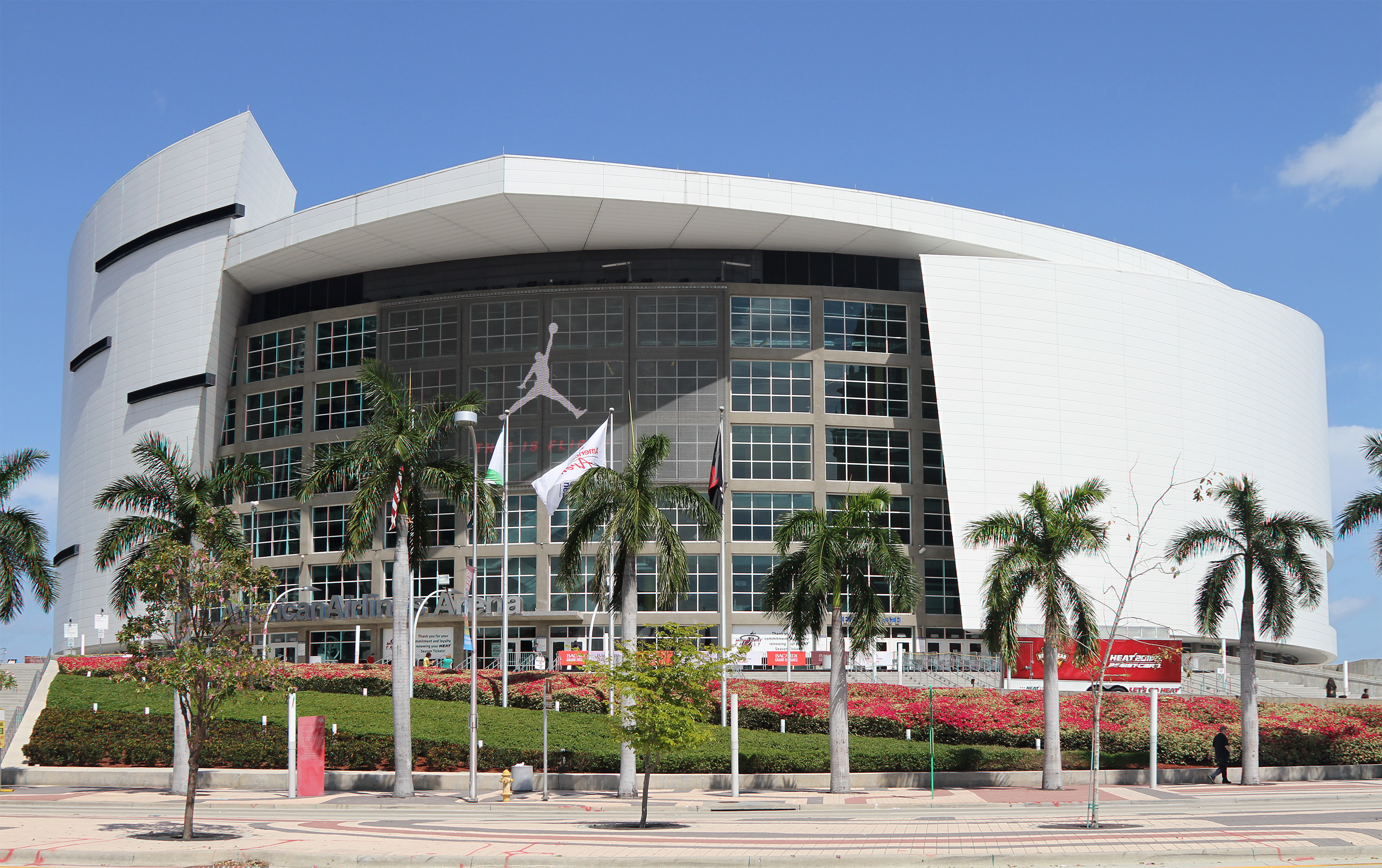
The FTX Arena in Miami, Florida

FTX sponsored a number of sports teams and organizations. Deals included the naming rights to the Miami Heat's basketball stadium, renaming it FTX Arena, a partnership with Major League Baseball to place the FTX logo on the uniforms of umpires, and a deal with Mercedes-AMG Petronas F1 Team to add the FTX logo to their cars and merchandise. The professional esports organization TSM also had a naming rights deal with FTX, under which the organization became TSM FTX.

Other sponsorships included the title sponsorships of the first season of MLB Home Run Derby X, and the title sponsorship of the tournaments FTX Road to Miami and FTX Crypto Cup as part of the Champions Chess Tour 2022.

Following the bankruptcy of FTX in November 2022, Mercedes-AMG F1, TSM and the Miami Heat cut ties with the company, with the last also announcing that they would be seeking a new naming rights partner for the FTX Arena. FTX held talks with American singer-songwriter Taylor Swift starting in the fall of 2021 regarding a $100 million sponsorship deal but negotiations were broken off the following spring without a deal being reached.
