= 2021 Squid Game cryptocurrency scam =

Unofficial unsellable currency

In 2021, a significant fraudulent event took place in the world of cryptocurrency. Inspired by the popular South Korean Netflix series Squid Game, this cryptocurrency, known as $SQUID (Squid Coin), promised investors an opportunity to play and earn an through "upcoming fan-made online game" inspired by Squid Game. However, it quickly unraveled as a rug pull, leaving investors defrauded of over 3.3 million dollars.

== Background ==
The creators of Squid Coin presented it as a revolutionary opportunity for investors to participate in an upcoming fan-made online game inspired by the Netflix series Squid Game, in which participants compete in deadly children's games for money. Marketed as a "play-to-earn cryptocurrency," it garnered immense attention and witnessed a meteoric rise in its price, surging by thousands of percentage points.

The mechanics of the scam involved enticing investors with the promise of earning rewards by purchasing Squid Coin tokens. Investors were led to believe that these tokens could be used to participate in the forthcoming Squid Game online platform, where they could earn more tokens through gameplay. These earned tokens were purportedly exchangeable for other cryptocurrencies or national currencies, further fueling the excitement around Squid Coin.

The coin operated as a smart contract on the BNB Smart blockchain and was made available for purchase on October 20.

== Warnings and disappearance ==
The absence of an option to sell the coin was a significant loophole that signaled trouble. Furthermore, the website contained numerous errors, and social media accounts associated with the project disappeared.

As the value of Squid Coin skyrocketed, concerns began to surface. Investors who had bought into the cryptocurrency soon discovered that they were unable to sell their tokens. This inability to resell raised significant doubts about the legitimacy of the project and started to sound alarm bells among cryptocurrency experts and enthusiasts.

On the 1st of November, the value of a single Squid Coin plummeted from a peak of $2,861 all the way to a third of a cent, leaving investors with worthless tokens. It became apparent that the developers of Squid Coin had quickly cashed out their holdings, draining liquidity from the exchange (a practice commonly referred to as a rug pull).

As the scam unraveled, investors were left with substantial losses, while the developers of Squid Coin disappeared from the public eye, taking an estimated $3.38 million with them. The project's website, which had previously been active, disappeared along with its social media accounts, further erasing any trace of its existence. In an attempt to conceal their activity, the scammers funneled the fraudulent funds through the cryptocurrency mixing service Tornado Cash.
