= Richard Teng =

Singaporean chief executive

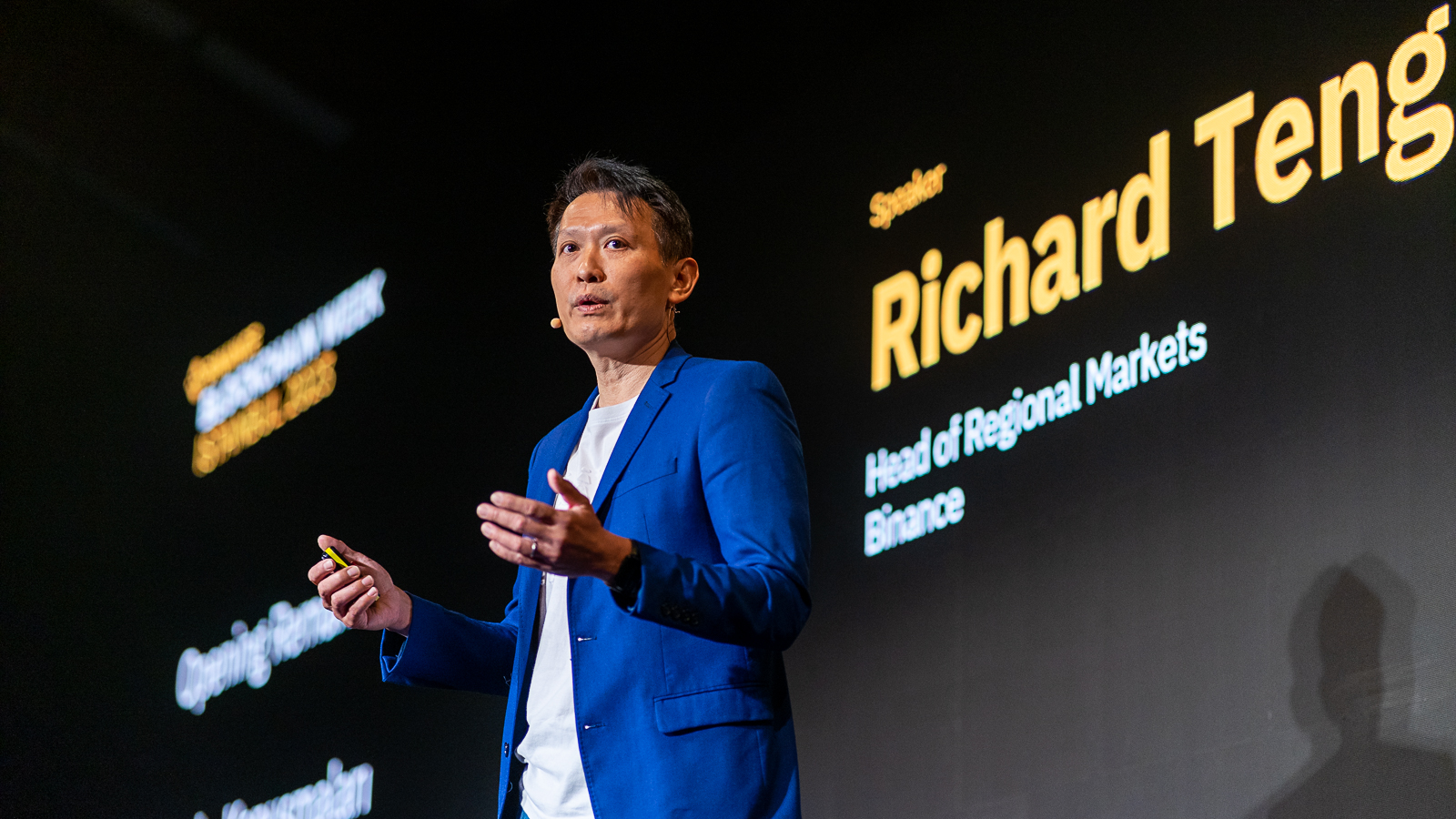
- Richard Teng speaking at Binance Blockchain Week 2023 in Istanbul
- Born: 1969 or 1970 (age 55–56); Singapore
- Education: Nanyang Technological University; University of Western Australia
- Occupation: CEO of Binance
- Employer: Binance

Richard Teng is a Singaporean business executive who is the co-chief executive officer (CEO) of Binance, a cryptocurrency exchange. Previously, he worked for the Monetary Authority of Singapore and was chief regulatory officer of the Singapore Exchange and CEO of the Abu Dhabi Global Market.

== Early life and education ==
Teng was born in Singapore. He earned an accounting degree from Nanyang Technological University and a master's degree in applied finance from the University of Western Australia.

== Career ==
Teng was a civil servant and business executive in the financial and regulatory sectors for three decades. He was the director of corporate finance at the Monetary Authority of Singapore, where he worked for thirteen years. He later held multiple positions at the Singapore Exchange (SGX), including: senior vice president, head of issuer regulation, chief of staff for risk management, and chief regulatory officer. He was CEO of the Abu Dhabi Global Market for six years starting in 2015.

Teng joined Binance in August 2021 as CEO of the company's Singapore business. He became regional head of Asia, Europe, and the Middle East and North Africa, in April 2023, and was later the global head of regional markets. He was named CEO of Binance in November 2023, replacing founder Changpeng Zhao who stepped down after pleading guilty to criminal charges related to his management of Binance. Previously, Teng was a board member of Abu Dhabi-based Lulu Financial Group in 2021–2022.
