= Wash trade =

Market manipulation tactic which creates the illusion of demand

Wash trading is a form of market manipulation in which an entity simultaneously sells and buys the same financial instruments, creating a false impression of market activity without incurring market risk or changing the entity's market position. Wash trading has been deemed illegal in most jurisdictions. For instance, the United States enacted the Commodity Exchange Act (CEA) in 1936 to prohibit wash trading. To comply with regulations, most regulated stock exchanges have implemented protective measures, such as Self-Trade Prevention Functionality (STPF) on the Intercontinental Exchange (ICE). However, in some unregulated emerging markets, such as cryptocurrency, the practice is common. In June 2025 Aleksei Andriunin, the founder of the cryptocurrency market maker Gotbit, was sentenced by a U.S. District Court in Massachusetts to eight months in prison. He had signed a plea agreement over wire fraud and market manipulation charges. Prosecutors said Gotbit carried out wash trades worth millions of dollars for its clients.

Various practitioners engage in wash trading for several reasons. Some examples include:

- Artificially inflating trading volume gives the impression that the financial instrument is more in demand than it actually is.
- Falsely driving up asset prices by fabricating trade history with increasing prices, particularly in illiquid assets.
- Generating commission fees to brokers as compensation for services that cannot be openly paid for, as demonstrated by some participants in the Libor scandal.
- Boosting trading volume to create an image of popularity (as a trading platform) to attract customers.

Several prevalent wash trading practices include:

- Engaging in self-trading by placing bid/ask orders and subsequently filling them, which is particularly effective in low-liquidity assets such as non-fungible token (NFT) markets. A study by Advait Jayant found that over 70% of the transaction volumes were attributed to wash trading. It was observed that wash trading had a short-term positive impact on non-wash trading activities on the following day, but this influence became negative over extended periods. Data indicates that from the inception of the market until January 2023, wash trading volumes amounted to approximately $26.88 billion, compared to $10.46 billion in non-wash trades.
- Utilizing multiple accounts to facilitate trades between them.
- Employing automated trading algorithms for swift, large-scale execution of wash trades or blending these activities with market-making strategies.
- Trading platforms forging trading records in their trading history database.

== See also ==
- Bucket shop (stock market)
- Round-tripping (finance)
- Substance over form
- Pump and dump
