= BTCC (cryptocurrency exchange) =

Cryptocurrency exchange company in the UK

- Trade name: BTCC
- Formerly: BTC China
- Industry: Cryptocurrency exchange
- Founded: June 2011
- Founder: Huang Xiaoyu; Yang Linke; Bobby C. Lee
- Area served: Worldwide
- Key people: Dan Liu (CEO)
- Website: btcc.com

BTC & Crypto (BTCC) is a cryptocurrency exchange established in 2011. Incorporated in 2013 in Shanghai, it became the largest cryptocurrency exchange by volume globally in November 2013. It ceased trading in China in 2017 due to regulatory changes by the Chinese government and was purchased in 2018 by an investment firm in Hong Kong.

== History ==
=== 2011–2017: Early history ===
BTCC was founded by Bobby Lee, Yang Linke, and Huang Xiaoyu in 2011. Initially, it was a part-time project for Lee. BTCC (then known as BTC China) incorporated in 2013 and acquired investors, established a headquarters in Shanghai, and had 20 employees. Lee became chief executive officer. Usage of BTCC increased following the elimination of trading fees and it became the largest bitcoin exchange by volume in the world in November 2013. That month, BTCC received US$5 million in Series A funding from Lightspeed China Partners and Lightspeed Venture Partners.

The company stopped accepting deposits of yuan in December 2013 due to regulatory changes by the People's Bank of China that barred financial institutions from trading in bitcoin, leading third-party payment providers to end their service to BTCC. The company began taking yuan again in January 2014 after it further examined rules, which specifically barred banks from participating in bitcoin business activities. It rebranded in 2015, changing its name to BTCC.

=== 2017–present: Growth and international expansion ===
BTCC stopped all trading in China in September 2017 following an announcement by the People's Bank that the country would ban initial coin offerings. The company was purchased by an unnamed firm in Hong Kong in January 2018. Portions of its services were registered in the United Kingdom.

BTCC was among 16 foreign cryptocurrency businesses lacking the proper registration to operate in South Korea in 2022. An intelligence unit of the Financial Services Commission reported the businesses to the nation's investigative body and asked other agencies to block access to the firms' local websites.

Dan Liu became CEO of BTCC in May 2025. The same year, the company made Jaren Jackson Jr. a brand ambassador.
