= Cryptocurrency wallet =

Medium to store keys for signing cryptocurrency transactions

An example paper printable bitcoin wallet consisting of one bitcoin address for receiving and the corresponding private key for spending

A cryptocurrency wallet is a device, physical medium, program or an online service which stores the public and/or private keys for cryptocurrency transactions. In addition to this basic function of storing the keys, a cryptocurrency wallet more often offers the functionality of encrypting and/or signing information. Signing can for example result in executing a smart contract, a cryptocurrency transaction (see "bitcoin transaction" image), identification, or legally signing a 'document' (see "application form" image).

== History ==
In 2008 bitcoin was introduced as the first cryptocurrency following the principle outlined by Satoshi Nakamoto in the paper "Bitcoin: A Peer-to-Peer Electronic Cash System". The project was described as an electronic payment system using cryptographic proof instead of trust. It also mentioned using cryptographic proof to verify and record transactions on a blockchain.

The first wallet program, simply named Bitcoin, and sometimes referred to as the Satoshi client, was released in January 2009 by Satoshi Nakamoto as open-source software. In version 0.5 the client moved from the wxWidgets user interface toolkit to Qt, and the whole bundle was referred to as Bitcoin-Qt. After the release of version 0.9, the software bundle was renamed Bitcoin Core to distinguish itself from the underlying network. Bitcoin Core is, perhaps, the best known implementation or client. Forks of Bitcoin Core exist, such as Bitcoin XT, Bitcoin Unlimited, and Parity Bitcoin.

== Types of Wallets ==
=== Software wallets ===
Software wallets are software applications that allow users to manage and transfer digital assets, and sign messages.

There are several modes in which software wallets can operate. They have an inverse relationship with regard to trustlessness and computational requirements.

- Full clients verify transactions directly by downloading a full copy of the blockchain. They do not require trust in any external parties. Full clients check the validity of mined blocks, preventing them from transacting on a chain that breaks or alters network rules. Because of its size and complexity, downloading and verifying the entire blockchain is not suitable for all computing devices.
- Lightweight clients consult full nodes to send and receive transactions without requiring a local copy of the entire blockchain (see simplified payment verification – SPV). This makes lightweight clients much faster to set up and allows them to be used on low-power, low-bandwidth devices such as smartphones. When using a lightweight wallet, however, the user must trust full nodes, as it can report faulty values back to the user. Lightweight clients follow the longest blockchain and do not ensure it is valid, requiring trust in full nodes.

Third-party internet services called online wallets or webwallets offer similar functionality but may be easier to use. In this case, credentials to access funds are stored with the online wallet provider rather than on the user's hardware. As a result, the user must have complete trust in the online wallet provider. A malicious provider or a breach in server security may cause entrusted crypto to be stolen. An example of such a security breach occurred with Mt. Gox in 2011.

=== Cold storage ===
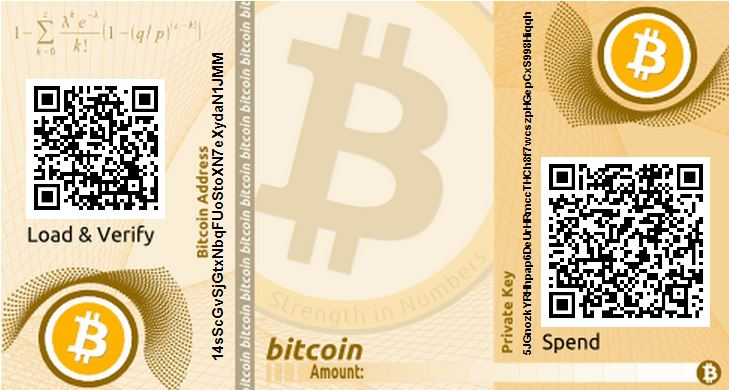
A paper wallet with a banknote-like design. Both the private key and the address are visible in text form and as 2D barcodes.

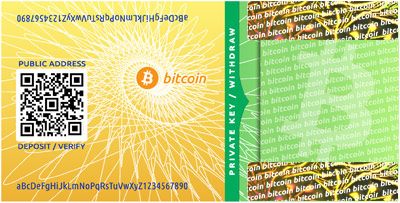
A paper wallet with the address visible for adding or checking stored funds. The part of the page containing the private key is folded over and sealed.

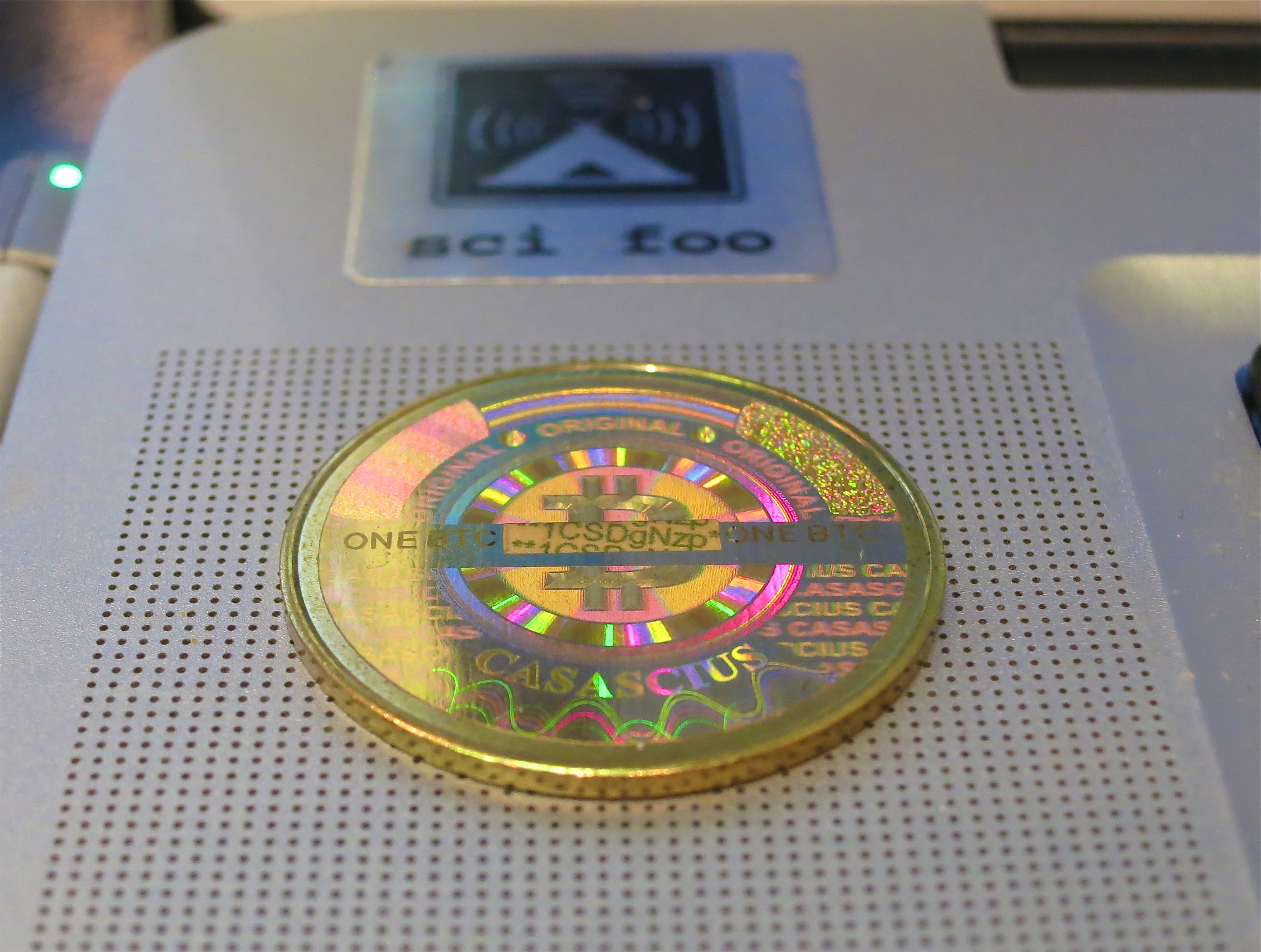
A brass token with a private key hidden beneath a tamper-evident security hologram. A part of the address is visible through a transparent part of the hologram.

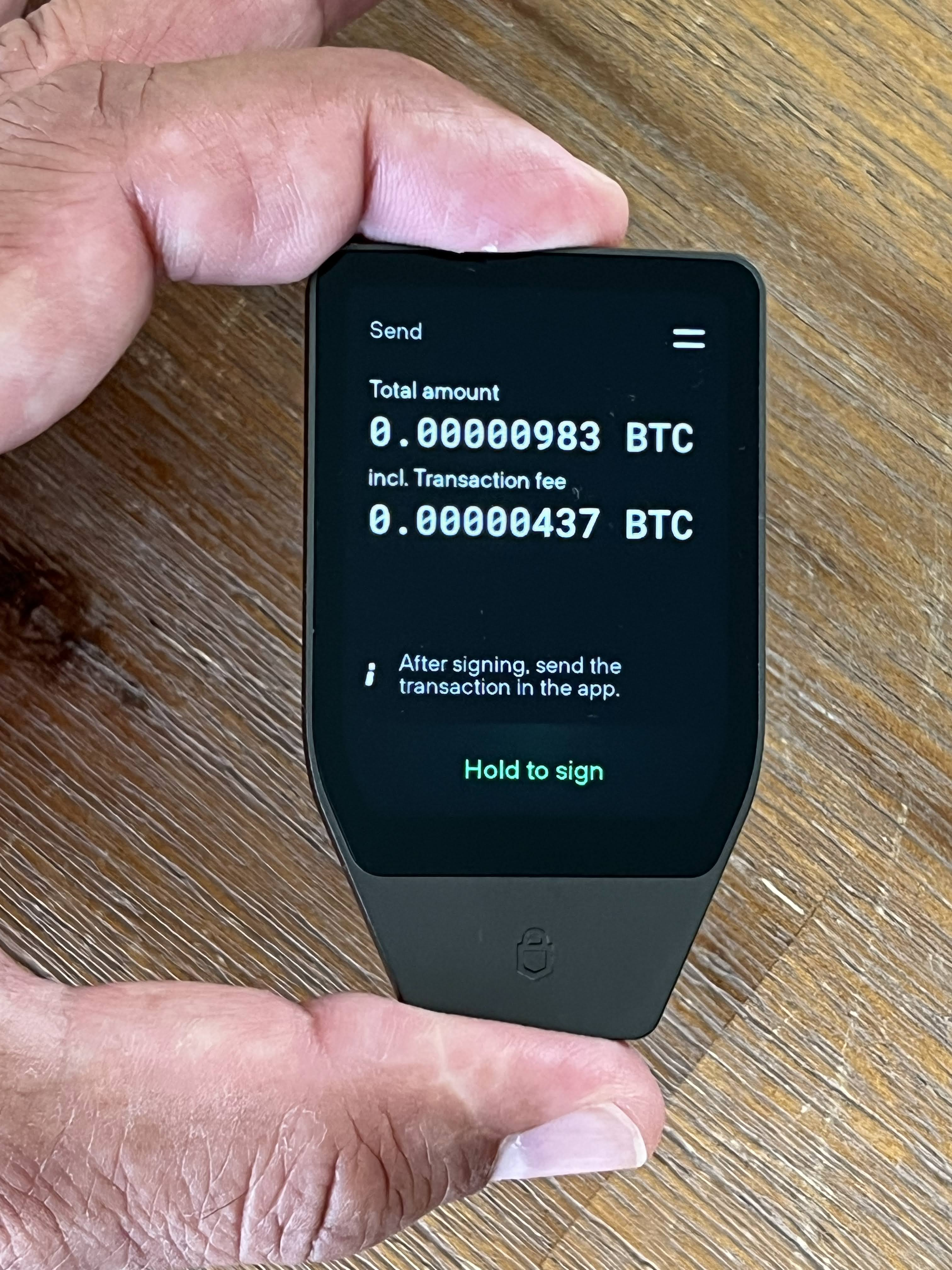
A hardware wallet peripheral which processes bitcoin payments without exposing any credentials to the computer

"Cold storage" simply means keeping the private keys out of reach of hackers by storing or generating them on a device that is not connected to the internet. The credentials necessary to spend crypto can be stored offline in a number of different ways, from simple paper printouts of private keys, to specialized hardware wallets.

==== Paper wallets ====
A paper wallet is created with a keypair generated on a computer with no internet connection; the private key is written or printed onto the paper and then erased from the computer. The paper wallet can then be stored in a safe physical location for later retrieval. Physical wallets can also take the form of metal token coins with a private key accessible under a security hologram in a recess struck on the reverse side. The security hologram is tamper-evident technology which self-destructs when removed from the token, showing that the private key has been accessed. The British Museum's coin collection includes four specimens of funded bitcoin tokens; one is currently on display in the museum's money gallery.

==== Hardware wallets ====
A hardware "wallet" is a small and portable computer peripheral that signs transactions as requested by the user. These devices store private keys and carry out signing and encryption internally, and do not share any sensitive information with the host computer except already signed (and thus unalterable) transactions. Because hardware wallets never expose their private keys, even computers that may be compromised by malware do not have a vector to access or steal them.The user sets a passcode when setting up a hardware signer. As hardware signers are tamper-resistant, without the passcode the assets cannot be accessed.

=== Multisignature wallet ===
In contrast to simple cryptocurrency wallets requiring just one party to sign a transaction, multi-sig wallets require multiple parties to sign a transaction. Multisignature wallets are designed to increase security by requiring a predefined threshold of signatures from independent private keys to authorize any transaction.

== Technology ==
=== Private and public key generation ===
A cryptocurrency wallet works by random number being generated. The number is converted to a private key using the specific requirements of the cryptocurrency. A public key is then generated from the private key. This private key is used by the owner to access and send cryptocurrency, while the public key can be shared to any third party to receive cryptocurrency.

Up to this stage no computer or electronic device is required and all key pairs can be mathematically derived and written down by hand. The private key and public key pair (known as an address) are not known by the blockchain or anyone else. The blockchain will only record the transaction of the public address when cryptocurrency is sent to it, thus recording in the blockchain ledger the transaction of the public address.

=== Duplicate private keys ===
Collision (two or more wallets having the same private key) is theoretically possible, since keys can be generated without being used for transactions, and are therefore offline until recorded in the blockchain ledger. However, this possibility is effectively negated because the theoretical probability of two or more private keys being the same is extremely low. The number of possible wallets and thus private keys is extremely high, so duplicating or hacking a certain key would be inconceivable.

=== Seed phrases ===
In modern convention a seed phrase is now utilised which is a random 12 to 24 (or even greater) list of dictionary words which is an unencrypted form of the private key. (Words are easier to memorize than numerals). When online, exchange and hardware wallets are generated using random numbers, and the user is asked to supply a seed phrase. If the wallet is misplaced, damaged or compromised, the seed phrase can be used to re-access the wallet and associated keys and cryptocurrency in toto.

=== Wallets ===
A number of technologies known as wallets exist that store the key value pair of private and public key known as wallets. A wallet hosts the details of the key pair making cryptocurrency transactions possible. Multiple methods exist for storing keys or seeds in a wallet.

A brainwallet or brain wallet is a type of wallet in which one memorizes a passcode (a private key or seed phrase). Brainwallets may be attractive due to plausible deniability or protection against governmental seizure, but are vulnerable to password guessing (especially large-scale offline guessing). Several hundred brainwallets exist on the Bitcoin blockchain, but most of them have been drained, sometimes repeatedly.

== Characteristics ==
In addition to the basic function of storing the keys, a cryptocurrency wallet may also have one or more of the following characteristics.

=== Simple cryptocurrency wallet ===
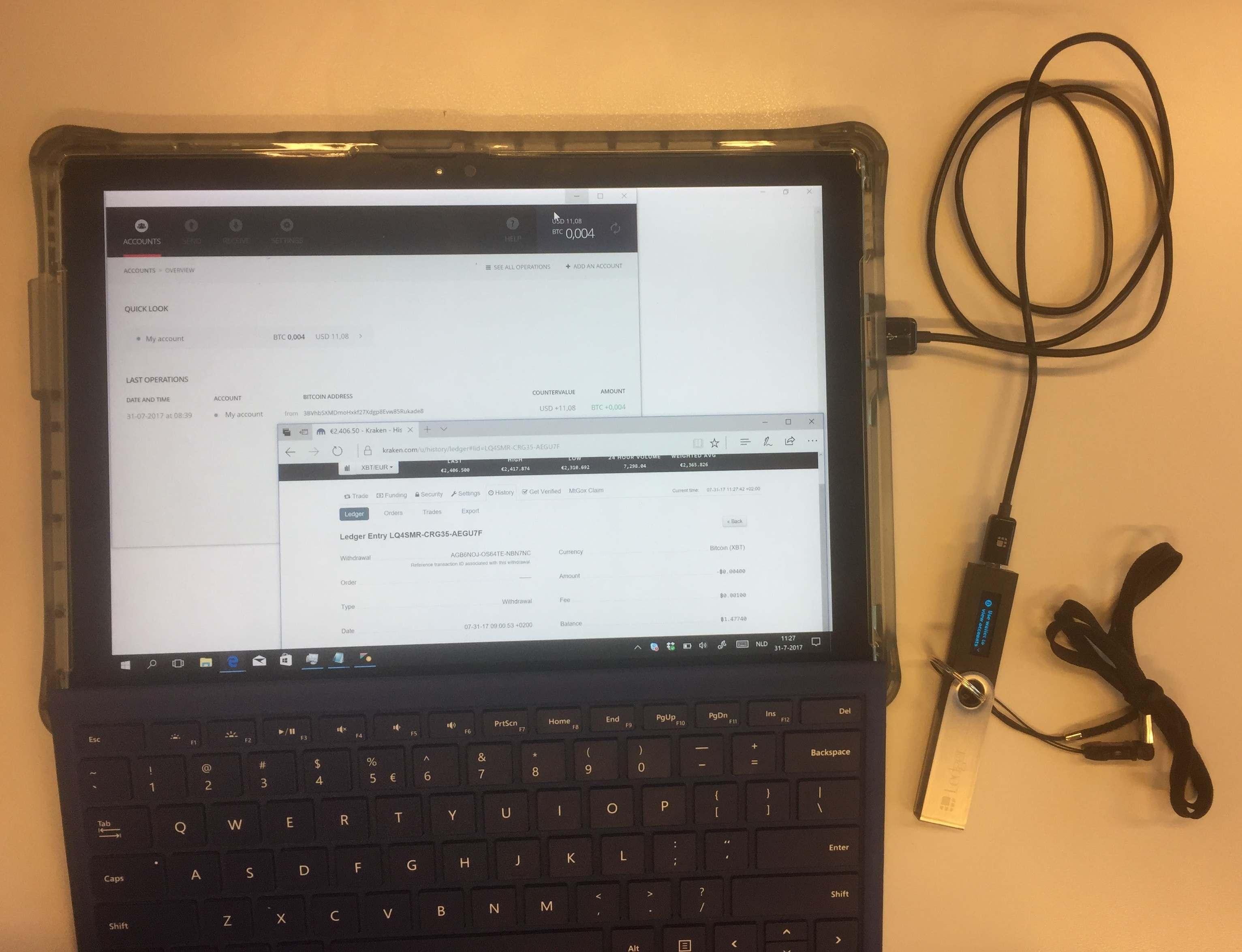
A bitcoin transaction from a web based cryptocurrency exchange to a hardware cryptocurrency wallet

A simple cryptocurrency wallet contains pairs of public and private cryptographic keys. The keys can be used to track ownership, receipt or spend cryptocurrencies. A public key allows others to make payments to the address derived from it, whereas a private key enables the spending of cryptocurrency from that address.

The cryptocurrency itself is not in the wallet. In the case of bitcoin and cryptocurrencies derived from it, the cryptocurrency is decentrally stored and maintained in a publicly available distributed ledger called the blockchain.

=== eID wallet ===
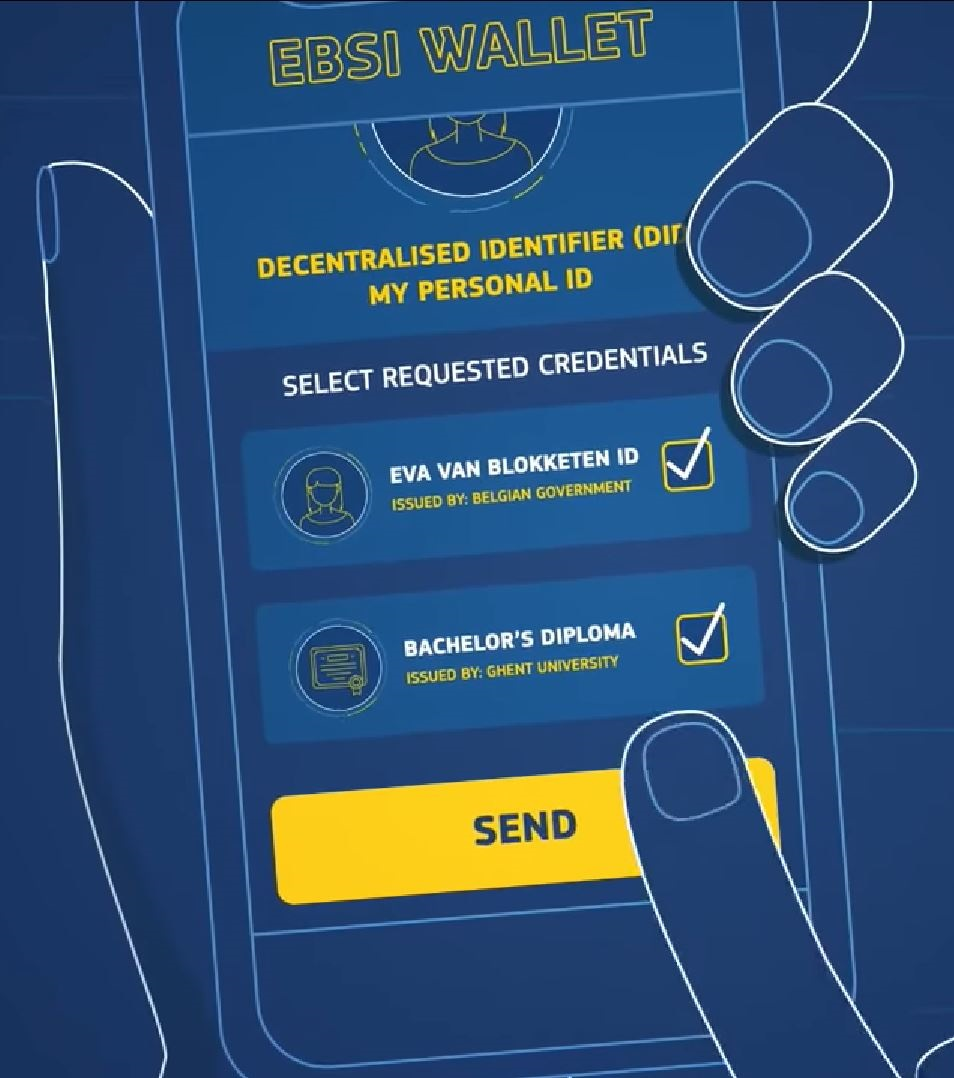
Providing an eID and a diploma and digitally signing the 'application form' with a crypto wallet app

Some wallets are specifically designed to be compatible with a framework. The European Union is creating an eIDAS compatible European Self-Sovereign Identity Framework (ESSIF) which runs on the European Blockchain Services Infrastructure (EBSI). The EBSI wallet is designed to (securely) provide information, an eID and to sign 'transactions'.

=== Key derivation ===
==== Sequential deterministic wallet ====
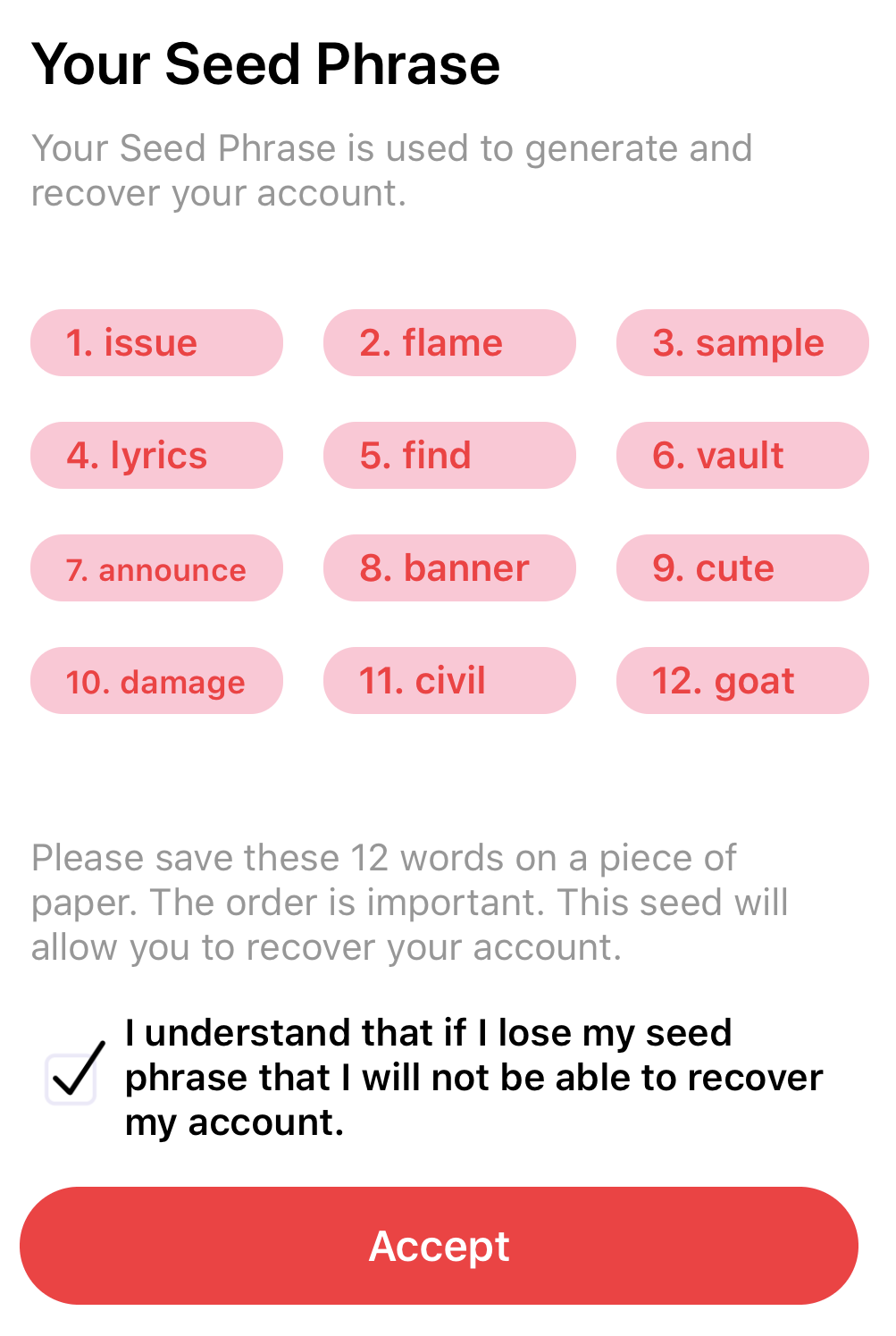
A deterministic wallet seed phrase of a crypto wallet

A sequential deterministic wallet utilizes a simple method of generating addresses from a known starting string or "seed". This would utilize a cryptographic hash function, e.g. SHA-256 (seed + n), where n is an ASCII-coded number that starts from 1 and increments as additional keys are needed.

==== Hierarchical deterministic wallet ====
The hierarchical deterministic (HD) wallet was publicly described in BIP32. As a deterministic wallet, it derives keys from a single master root seed, but instead of having a single "chain" of key pairs, an HD wallet supports multiple independent key pair chains.

This allows a single seed to be used to generate an entire tree of key pairs with a stratified structure.

==== Non-deterministic wallet ====
In a non-deterministic wallet, each key is randomly generated independently and is not derived from a common seed. Therefore, any backups of the wallet must store each and every private key used as an address, as well as a buffer of future keys that may have already been issued as addresses but have not yet received payments.

== Security ==
A wallet may have known and unknown vulnerabilities. A supply chain attack or side-channel attack are ways of introducing vulnerabilities. In extreme cases a computer which is not connected to any network can be hacked.

To mitigate the risk of crypto wallet hacking, one can choose for a cold wallet, which remains offline and disconnected from the internet. A cold wallet refers to a physical device, such as a pen drive, that is utilized as a secure storage medium for transferring money from a hot wallet. Cold wallets have also been hacked. In late July 2026, cold wallet manufacturer Coinkite disclosed that a bug in software used on its devices allowed hackers to access cold wallets. This hack has led to losses of approximately $130 million as of early August 2026.

== Usage ==
When using a merchant site that accepts server-side digital wallets, customers enter their name, payment, and delivery information. Following the purchase, the customer is typically requested to register for a wallet with a user name and password for future purchases.

Wallets are free for consumers but cost retailers. Wallet sellers may receive a portion of merchant purchases made through their wallets. In other circumstances, digital wallet vendors conduct cardholder-merchant transactions for a set fee.

== See also ==
- Cryptocurrency exchange
- Cryptography
- Cryptocurrency and security
- Decentralized application
- Medium of exchange
- Public-key cryptography
- Web3
