= Postage stamps and postal history of the Bahamas =

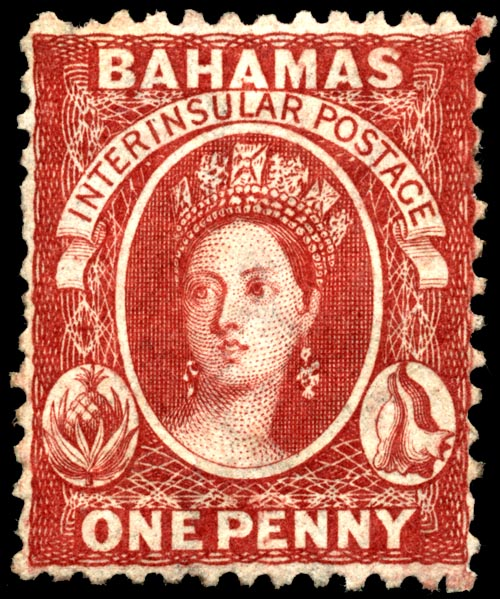
1863 version of the 1859 design

The postal history of the Bahamas begins in the 18th century, with the first post office operating since 1733. The earliest known letters date from 1802. In 1804 a straight-line "BAHAMAS" handstamp came into use. The Royal Mail Line initiated a regular mail service in 1841, and from 1846 used a "Crown Paid" handstamp along with a dated postmark for New Providence.

== First stamps ==
The use of postage stamps began in April 1858 with a consignment of British stamps. These were cancelled "A05" at Nassau. The use of British stamps was brief however; in the following year the Bahamian post office became independent of London, and issued its own stamps beginning 10 June 1859. These stamps featured the "Chalon" portrait of Queen Victoria, along with symbols of the islands (pineapple and conch shell) and the inscription "INTERINSULAR POSTAGE", because at first the stamps were used only locally, with London continuing in charge of external mail until May 1860.

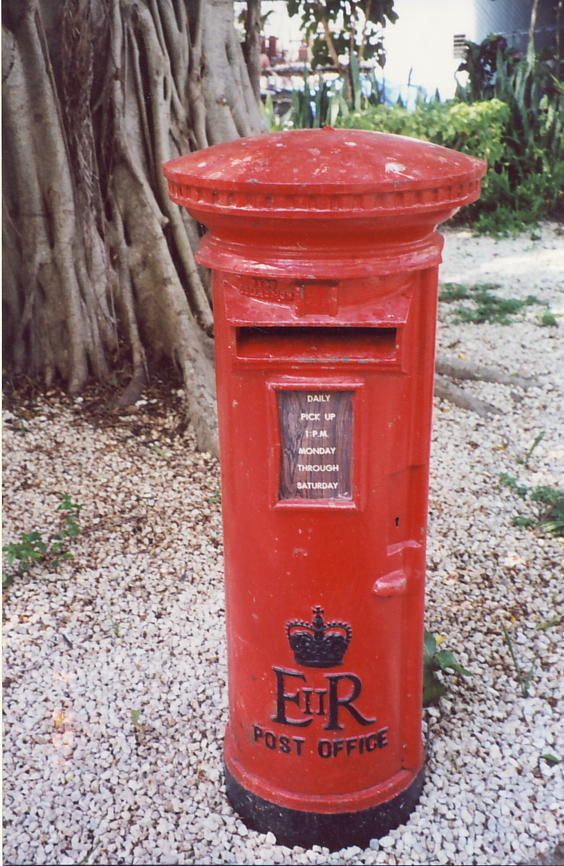
Letterbox in the Bahamas

Printed by Perkins Bacon, initially unwatermarked and imperforate, perforation was introduced in 1860, and the "Crown & CC" watermark in 1863. The transition to local control left Bahamians with only their 1d stamp to pay all rates of postage, and covers to foreign destinations show blocks of the stamp used to cover the 4d rate to North America and the 6d rate to Great Britain. The government remedied this in 1861 by contracting for 4d and 6d stamps, still using the Chalon head, but with a simpler design. De la Rue later took over printing duties in 1862, their product being differentiated by an 11.5-12 perforation, as opposed to the previous 14-16. A one-shilling value appeared in 1865.

In 1884, a new design employed the ubiquitous Victoria profile of the time, with the symbols retained, and "BAHAMAS" inscribed with colored letters in an arch over the vignette. Values issued ranged up to one pound. In 1901, the Bahamas became one of the Empire's early issuers of a pictorial stamp, with a depiction of the Queen's Staircase in Nassau. The same design was reused for 5-pence, 2-shilling, and 3-shilling values in 1903. In 1915, the Bahamas concluded an unusual agreement with Canada, in which the two countries arranged special delivery services by exchanging stamps, this being done for the benefit of tourists visiting from Canada. The Bahamians accomplished by overprinting 5d Staircase issues with "SPECIAL / DELIVERY" and sending them to Canada, where they were on sale in four post offices (Ottawa, Toronto, Westmount, and Winnipeg) for 10 cents each. The arrangement was short-lived, with only about 430 overprinted stamps being sold in Canada while it was in effect.

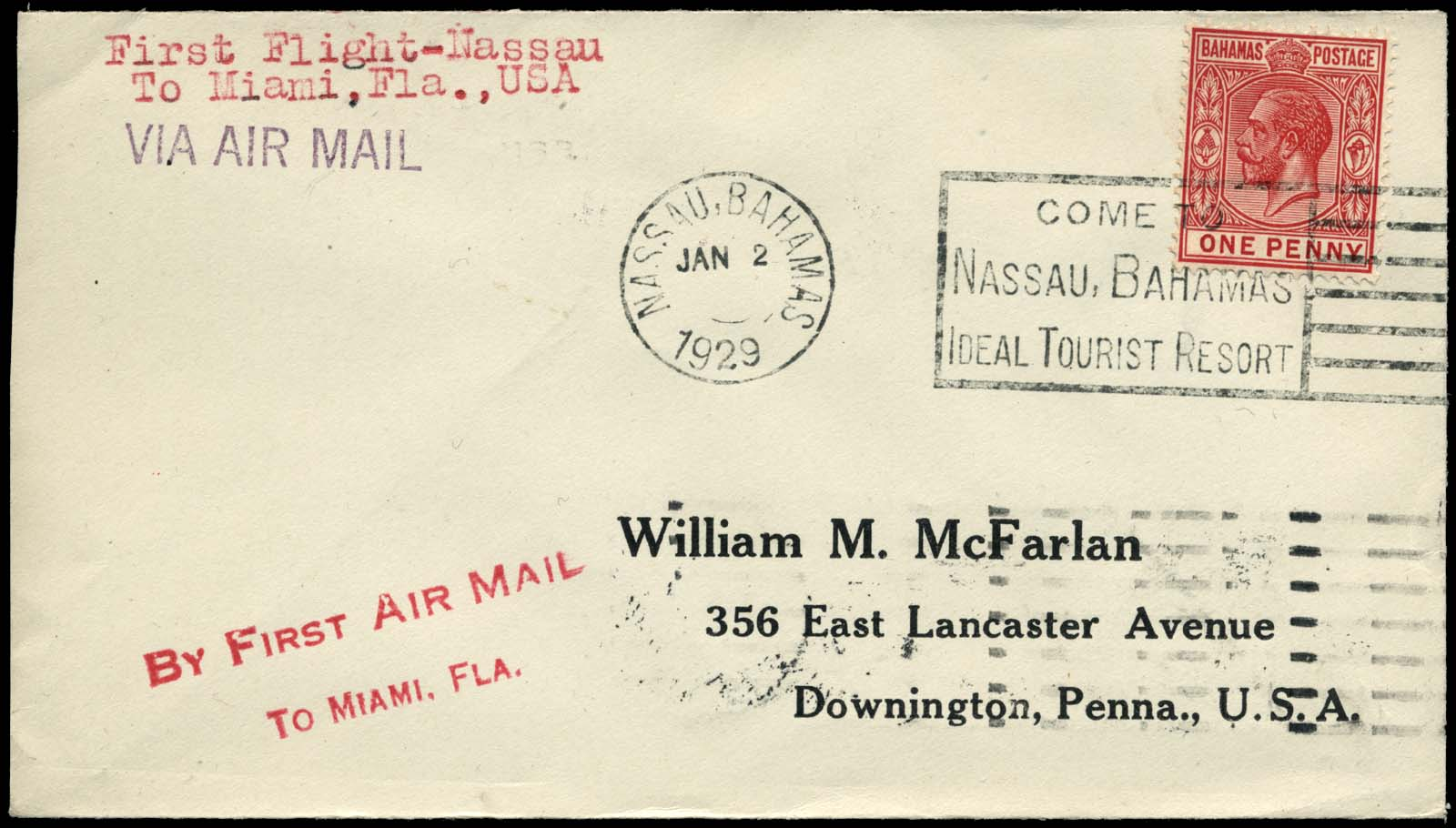
This cover was carried on the first flight from Nassau to Miami, Florida, 2 January 1929.

== Twentieth century ==
The years from 1902 into the 1930s involved the usual profiles of Edward VII and George V. In 1920 a set of five stamps celebrated peace after World War I, and in 1930 another set of five depicting the Bahamian seal marked the 300th anniversary of the colony's founding.

In 1935, a pictorial stamp depicted flamingoes in flight; this design was re-used in 1939 replaced with George VI's profile, along with designs showing Fort Charlotte, and a "sea garden", likely the first time underwater scenery appeared on a stamp. But the mainstay of the George VI period was a set of small definitives only slightly updated from previous designs.

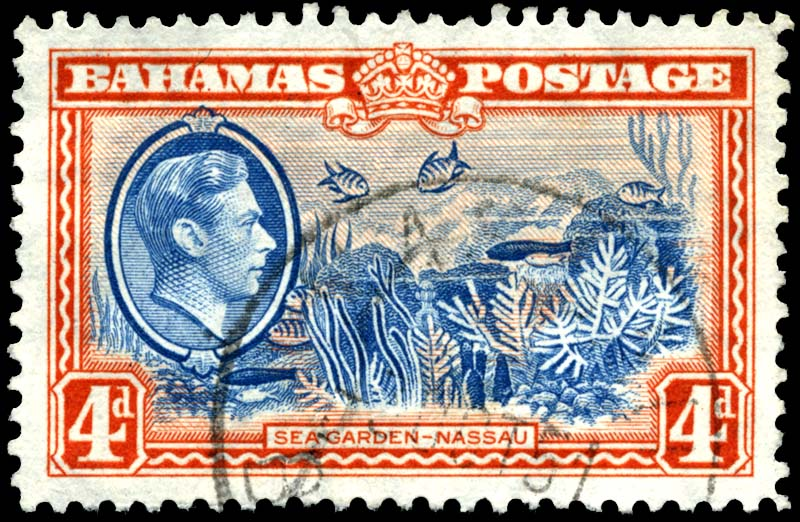
4d stamp showing the "sea garden" 1938

In October 1942, the definitives were overprinted to mark the 450th anniversary of Christopher Columbus' landing. In 1948, the 300th anniversary of the settlement of Eleuthera was commemorated with a set of 16 pictorials (somewhat belated in a way, since most of the Empire's colonies had extensive pictorial sets issued for them in 1938). The designs were re-used in the issue of 1954, replacing the portrait with one of Elizabeth II, and removing the commemorative inscription.

The Bahamas issued commemoratives for the centenary of Bahamian stamps in 1959, and for the centenary of Nassau in 1962. Also in 1962, two stamps were overprinted to mark the talks that led to the Nassau agreement. In 1964 the entire set of the 1954 issue was overprinted "NEW CONSTITUTION / 1964" in recognition of self-government.

A new set of 15 definitives in 1965 featured an updated layout, but repeating many of the same themes as seen in the 1954 stamps. These were overprinted with new currencies in the decimalisation of 1966, and then redesigned in 1967 with the new values.

From the 1970s on, the Bahamas issued an assortment of large and colorful stamps aimed at collectors, though not in great numbers.

== See also ==
- Revenue stamps of the Bahamas

== Sources ==
- Stanley Gibbons Ltd: various catalogues.
- Stamps of the World http://stampsoftheworld.co.uk/wiki/Category:Bahamas
- AskPhil – Glossary of Stamp Collecting Terms
- Encyclopaedia of Postal History
- Rossiter, Stuart; Flower, John (1986). The Stamp Atlas. London, Great Britain: Macdonald. pp. 146–147. ISBN 0-356-10862-7.
