= Chris Larson (disambiguation) =

Chris Larson (born 1980) is a Wisconsin politician.

Chris Larson may also refer to:

- Christopher Larson (born 1991), Bahamian footballer
- Chris Larson (fl. 2010s), Michigan politician in the 2010 United States House of Representatives elections in Michigan
- Christine Larson-Mason (born 1956), American field hockey player

== See also ==
- Chris Larsen (born 1960), American angel investor
- Christine Larsen (born 1967), Canadian synchronized swimmer
- Christine Swane (née Larsen; 1876–1960), Danish painter
- Christine Larson, American actress
- Christian Larson (disambiguation)
- Christian Larsen (disambiguation)
