= David Mitchell (murderer) =

Bahamian murderer (1972–2000)

- Born: 1972; Bahamas
- Died: January 6, 2000 (aged 27); Fox Hill Prison, Nassau, Bahamas
- Status: Executed by hanging
- Conviction: Murder (2 counts)
- Penalty: Death

David Mitchell (1972 – 6 January 2000) was a Bahamian murderer who killed two German tourists in the Bahamas and was executed as a result. His execution is the most recent to be performed by the government of the Bahamas.

Mitchell was convicted of stabbing his victims to death and received the mandatory sentence of death by hanging. He was originally scheduled to be executed on 10 August 1999, but execution was delayed to allow the Bahamian appeal courts to hear his appeal on the constitutionality of the death penalty. His appeal was rejected by the Bahamian courts and by the Judicial Committee of the Privy Council in London, which acts as the final court of appeal for the Bahamas. Mitchell was hanged in the Fox Hill Prison in Nassau on the morning of 6 January 2000.

His execution was controversial because it was carried out while he had an appeal pending before the Inter-American Commission on Human Rights. Amnesty International alleged that this amounted to a violation of the Bahamas' treaty obligations as a member of the Organization of American States. The victims' son had also requested that the death sentence be commuted. John Higgs was scheduled to be executed the same day as Mitchell for an unrelated murder, but he committed suicide the day before.
