= Michaiah Shobek =

American serial killer

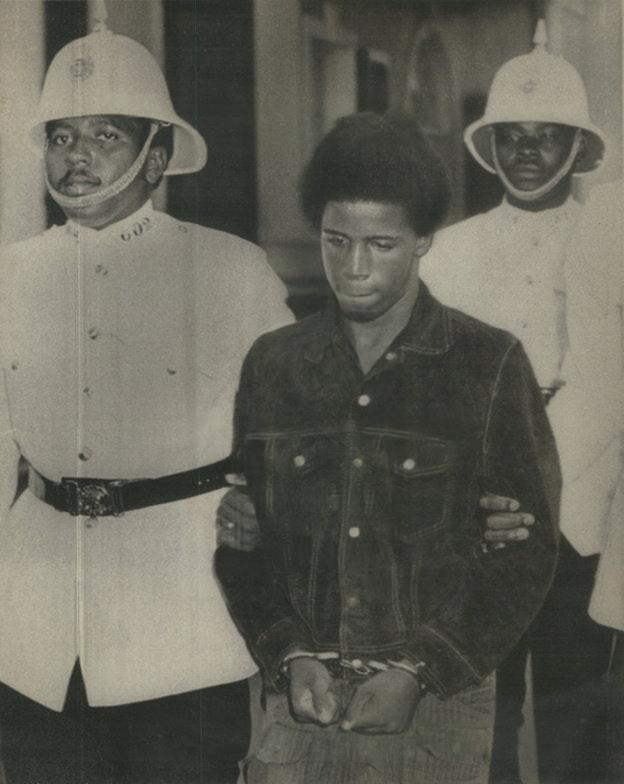
- Shobek leaves court after being sentenced to death (May 14, 1974)
- Born: James Michael Shoffner; 1954; Milwaukee, Wisconsin, U.S.
- Died: October 19, 1976 (aged 22); Fox Hill Prison, Nassau, Bahamas
- Cause of death: Execution by hanging
- Other name: "The Angels of Lucifer Killer"
- Status: Executed
- Motive: The victims were "angels of Lucifer"
- Conviction: Murder
- Penalty: Death

Details
- Victims: 3+
- Span of crimes: 1973–1974
- Country: Bahamas and possibly the United States
- Date apprehended: January 1974

Michaiah Shobek (born James Michael Shoffner; 1954 – October 19, 1976), known as The Angels of Lucifer Killer, was an American serial killer who murdered three fellow American tourists in the Bahamas from December 5, 1973, to January 26, 1974. He was convicted in 1974 and was executed for his crimes.

== Biography ==
Born James Michael Shoffner in Milwaukee, Shobek grew up with his mother Juanita Spencer, a cleaner at a Milwaukee school, without knowing his father. He caught a viral disease, which resulted in permanent brain damage, when he was two years old.

Shobek's family had a history of mental health issues. His half brother, Alex Shoffner, was the defendant in a landmark Wisconsin Supreme Court case on the legal definition of insanity. In 1965, Shoffner, a Milwaukee Journal Sentinel copy boy and city chess champion, admitted to 44 burglaries, four auto thefts, five robberies, and 25 purse-snatchings. While psychiatrists said he knew right from wrong, they found Shoffner "unable to control his impulse". The Wisconsin Supreme Court broadened the legal definition of insanity, allowing him to be sent to a mental hospital instead of prison. As of 1975, psychiatrists saying he still suffered from a "chronic undifferentiated schizophrenic reaction." A second half-brother, John Shoffner, had been institutionalized since 1961.

In December 1973, Shobek claimed to have had a vision of himself riding a horse and the vision told him to go the Bahamas. Shobek was arrested 17 times as a juvenile. Among the charges against him were, larceny, assault and battery, possession of marijuana, false fire alarms, purse-snatching, and use of a motor vehicle without authority. He once nearly died of an overdose. Shobek was committed to a boarding school, but ran home.

As an adult, he began working as a handyman, dreaming of one day becoming a songwriter. In November 1973, the then 19-year-old moved to the Bahamas to "bum around," changing his name to Michaiah Shobek.

=== Murders ===
On December 5, 1973, he murdered his first victim, 50-year-old Paul V. Howell, an attorney from Massillon, Ohio who was attending a convention. On Wednesday evening, Howell was in his hotel room, when he heard a knock on his door. Immediately upon opening it, he was stabbed in the chest and throat, killed instantly. Police suspected that he may have surprised burglars, and focused on that theory. Howell's body was sent off for preparation of funeral services in his native Ohio by Sunday, 9th of the same month.

On January 18 the following year, Shobek murdered his second victim: 44-year-old Irwin Bornstein, an accountant from Oceanside, New York. The father of 3 and accountant traveling on business arrived in Nassau from Miami through an Air Bahamas flight the previous day when Shobek spotted him and offered a ride. He drove Bornstein from the airport.

When he stopped the car and pulled out his knife, Bornstein opened the door and tried to escape but was caught and stabbed to death by his assailant. His body was discovered on Yamacraw Beach the next day by an employee of the Ministry of Fisheries, wearing only socks and shoes, with multiple stab wounds. A pen and pair of sunglasses belonging to Shobek were found next to the body. A black bag found eight miles away in Paradise Island contained some of Bornstein's papers and his killer's driver's license. When he was arrested later, Shobek was found to be in possession of Bornstein's pen.

On January 26, he murdered his final victim — 17-year-old student Katie Smith from Detroit, who was on a visit to the Bahamas with a group of other chaperoned students. The day before her murder, she had been seen walking with Shobek, and the following day, her body was found in a ditch by a cardboard box, strangled to death.

=== Arrest, trial and execution ===
Shobek, who was still 19 years of age at the time, was caught after he murdered Katie Smith. Due to a bank robbery investigation going on at the time, the preliminary hearing scheduled for February 18, 1974, was cut short.

The Bahamas decided to hold a single murder trial rather than three, as the prosecution only needed one murder conviction for Shobek to face execution. Shobek pleaded insanity and diminished mental capacity, stating that he had murdered them by order from God. Later on, he confessed to the other murders claiming that they were "angels of Lucifer." Shobek was convicted of murdering Bornstein and sentenced to death. He was initially scheduled to be hanged on October 8, but was granted an indefinite stay following an appeal filed by the United States Embassy, in which it was claimed that substantial information hadn't been supplied to the court.

During a psychiatric examination, the authorities learned that Shobek had been traveling between the United States and the Bahamas for about two years. Whether he murdered other people during this period is unknown.

Shobek's execution date was moved to October 19, when he was to be executed at the Fox Hill Prison. The day before the hanging, a lawyer from the Legal Aid Society representing Shobek's mother had pleaded to then-president Gerald Ford to make a last-minute appeal, but her request was refused by a presidential aide. Michaiah Shobek was hanged, and his death later was confirmed by the Investigation Department Chief, Addington Darville. He was the first American to be hanged in the Bahamas in 15 years.

== See also ==
- List of serial killers by country
