= Capital punishment in the Bahamas =

Capital punishment in the Bahamas is a legal punishment, and is conducted by hanging at Fox Hill Prison. The last execution in the country was on January 6, 2000. As of August 2012, only one convict, Mario Flowers, was under the sentence of death. Flowers' death sentence was commuted in 2016. Since independence from Britain, it has carried out more than a dozen executions.

== List of executions ==
This list is currently complete from 1976.

Offender	Age	Date	Victim
Michaiah Shobek	22	19 October 1976	Three American tourists
Charles Dickenson	21	29 January 1980	Desiree Darville
Vernal Storr	24	29 January 1980	Cedric Cleare
Winsette Hart	21	29 January 1980	Cedric Cleare
Gregory Johnson	24	28 April 1981	Erwin "Spanky" Edgecombe
Javon Newbold		6 September 1983	Steadman Brown
Colin V. Evans		6 September 1983	Jennie Russell
William Armbrister		10 April 1984	Livingstone and Henry LaFleur
Thomas Reckley	44	13 March 1996	Benjamin Strachan
Dwayne McKinney	24	28 March 1996	Brian Ferguson
Trevor Fisher	28	15 October 1998	Durventon Daniels
Richard Woods	51	15 October 1998	Pauline Johnson
David Mitchell	27	6 January 2000	Horst and Traude Henning

== See also ==
- Law of the Bahamas
