= Fort Fincastle (The Bahamas) =

Post revolutionary era fort in the Bahamas

Coordinates: 25°4′25″N 77°20′19″W

- Nassau, The Bahamas

Site information
- Type: Defensive fortification / lighthouse
- Open to the public: yes
- Condition: historic site

Location
- Fort Fincastle Fort Fincastle (North America)

Site history
- Built: ~1793
- In use: 1793-1817?

Fort Fincastle is a fort located in the city of Nassau on the island of New Providence in The Bahamas. It was built to provide protection to Nassau.

The fort, which is shaped like a paddle steamer, was built in 1793 by Lord Dunmore to protect Nassau from pirates. He named it Fort Fincastle, after his second title, Viscount Fincastle.

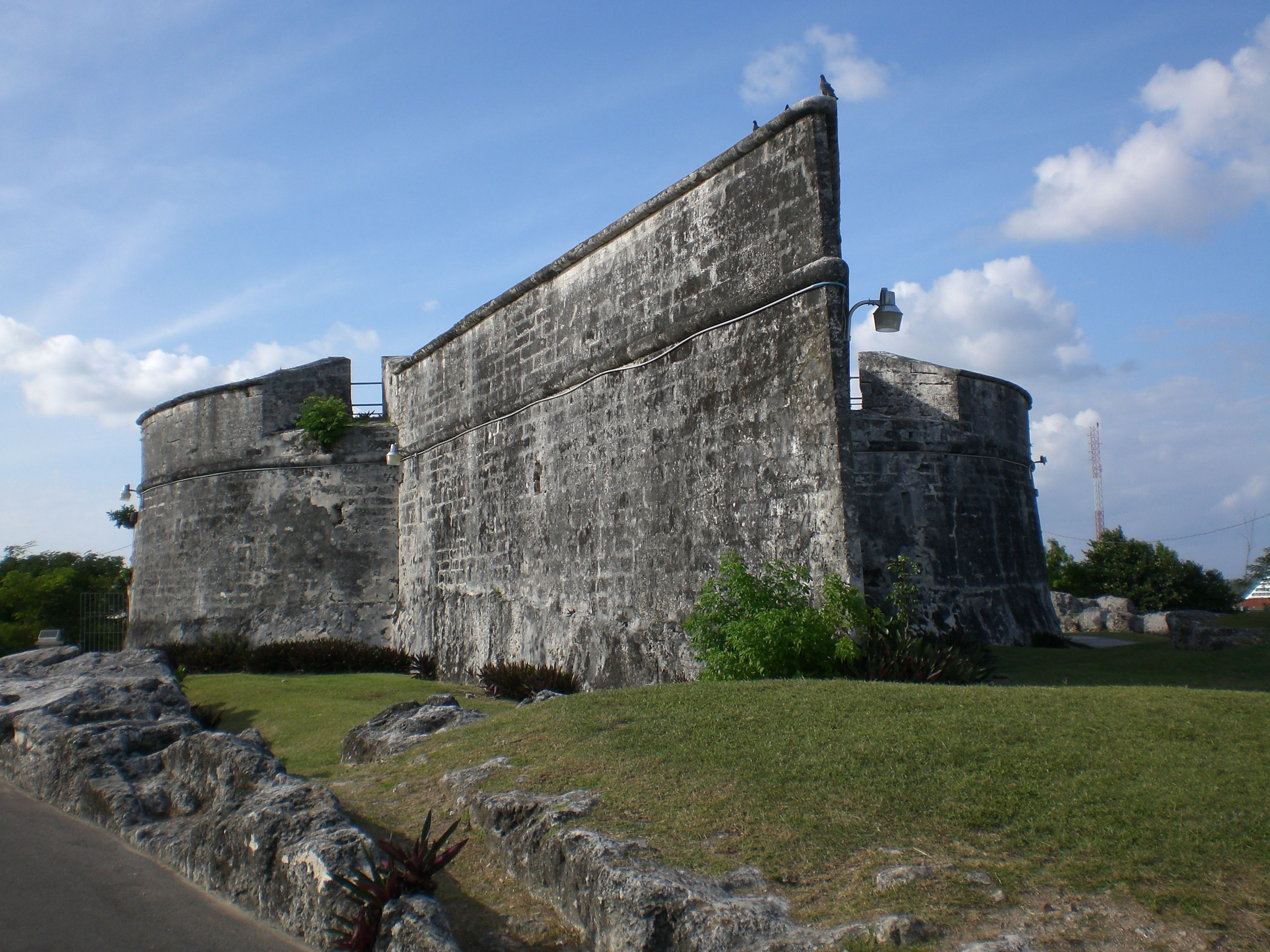
Fort Fincastle

Built on Society and Bennet's Hills, the fort overlooks the city of Nassau, Paradise Island, and the eastern approaches to New Providence. It is often accessed via the Queen’s Staircase by visitors on foot.

It mounted two 24-pounders, two 32-pounders, two 12-pounder cannons and one howitzer and served as a lighthouse until September 1817 when it was replaced by the lighthouse on Paradise Island (and was subsequently used as a signal station).

== See also ==
- Fort Montagu
- Fort Charlotte (Nassau)
- Old Fort of Nassau
