= Fox Hill Prison =

Prison in The Bahamas

- Interactive map of Fox Hill Prison
- Location: Fox Hill; 25°01′40″N 77°17′31″W
- Opened: March 1952
- Former name: Her Majesty's Prisons
- Managed by: Bahamas Department of Correctional Services

Fox Hill Prison is the only prison in The Bahamas. Located in Nassau, the capital, it is operated by the Bahamas Department of Correctional Services. Fox Hill Prison has minimum, medium, and maximum security facilities for male prisoners. It also has one block for female prisoners, as well as a medical block.

== History ==
The prison was established at its current location in Fox Hill, Bahamas, in March 1952. It was originally named Her Majesty's Prisons, a name shared with other prisons in the former British Empire. On August 11, 2014, its name was changed to The Bahamas Department of Correctional Services.

Fox Hill Prison was not the first prison in The Bahamas. The earliest record of a prison in what is now The Bahamas was from the 1600s. Former prisons in Nassau now house the Nassau Public Library and the Royal Bahamas Police Force headquarters.

The Bahamas also maintains the Carmichael Road Detention Centre for migrants in Nassau, New Providence. The center opened in 1993 as the first immigration detention facility in the Caribbean. Before that time, immigrant detainees in The Bahamas were held at Fox Hill. Most detainees at the Carmichael Road facility are from Haiti and Cuba. Like the Fox Hill prison, the Carmichael Road facility has been criticized for poor conditions. The Bahamian immigration minister said in 2022 that the government was upgrading the Carmichael Road facility and also planned to build a migrant detention center in Inagua.

== Conditions and reputation ==
The prison has been criticised internationally for poor conditions. A 2003 report by Amnesty International found that the prison had a high risk of transmission of diseases such as tuberculosis. According to the United States Department of State's 2020 Country Report on Human Rights Practices for The Bahamas, the prison is overcrowded, unsanitary, and lacks adequate food and medical care. The report stated that the prison was infested with maggots, rats, and insects; that cells had buckets instead of toilets; and that prisoners reported bed sores caused by sleeping on the ground. It also stated that prisoners shared 6 by 10 foot (2 by 3 meter) cells with no mattresses, no toilets, and as many as six prisoners to a cell. In 2017, Commissioner Patrick Wright confirmed that prisoners in the maximum-security block still had to use buckets instead of toilets. Bahamian attorney Romona Farquharson has stated that sometimes prisoners get as little as 30 minutes of outdoor time per week.

Commissioner of Correctional Services Doan Cleare said in 2022 that conditions in the prison had improved, with renovations and an end to the "issues with rodents". A video from The Nassau Guardian the same year showed a mixture of age and quality of facilities, with some facilities renovated, but some prisoners still in crowded cells.

== Notable inmates ==
Notable inmates detained at the prison include:

- Sam Bankman-Fried, businessman who founded the cryptocurrency exchange FTX and cryptocurrency trading firm Alameda Research; held at the prison in 2022 before he was extradited to the U.S. to face fraud charges.
- Viktor Kožený, held at Fox Hill while fighting extradition to the United States; Kožený's counsel said the prison had a reputation for "breaking even the toughest of men" through harsh conditions.
- Michaiah Shobek, serial killer executed in 1976.
- David Mitchell, executed in 2000 for the murder of two Germans in The Bahamas.
