= West Hill Street =

Street in Nassau, Bahamas

Coordinates: 25.0758°N 77.3466°W

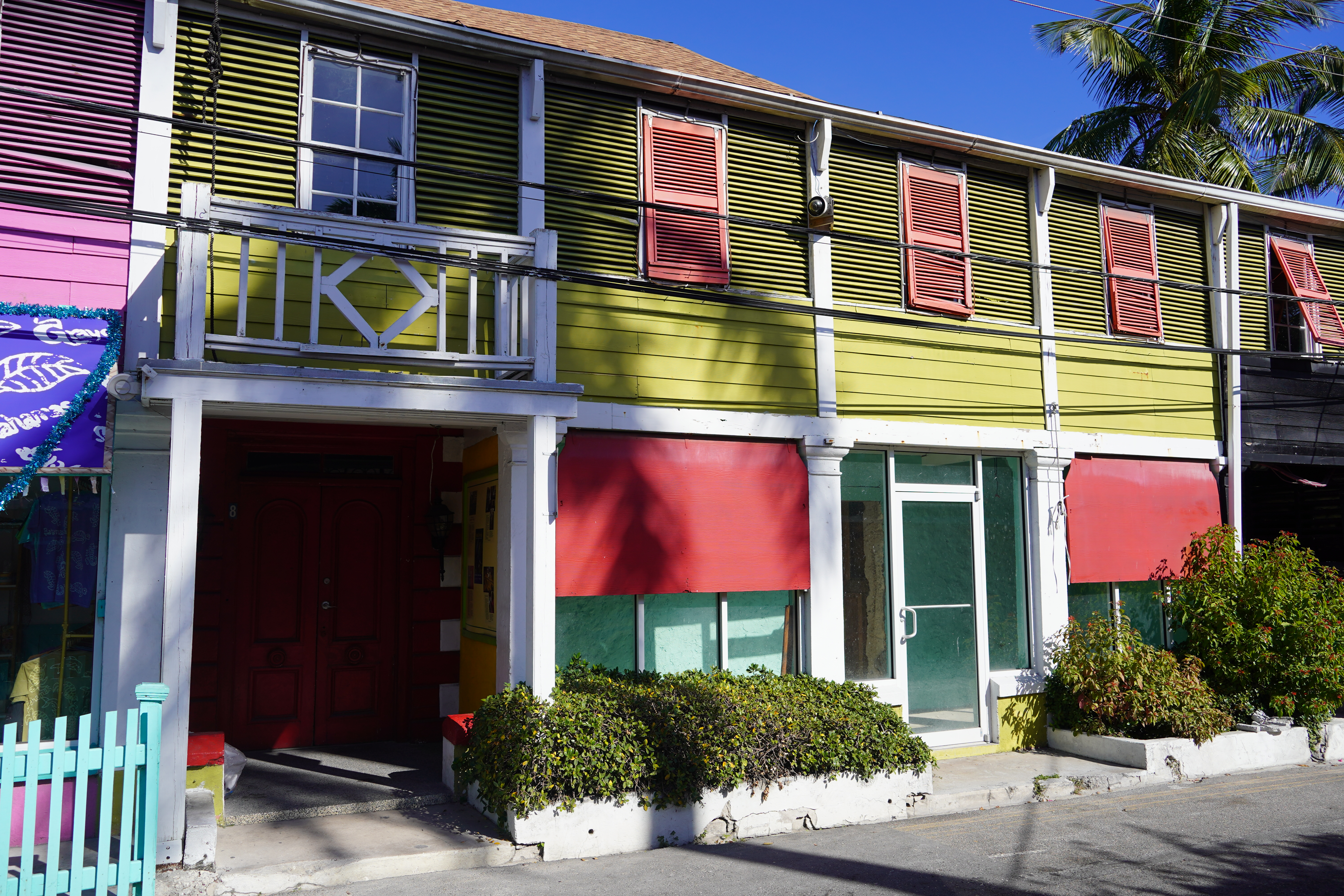
Houses on West Hill Street

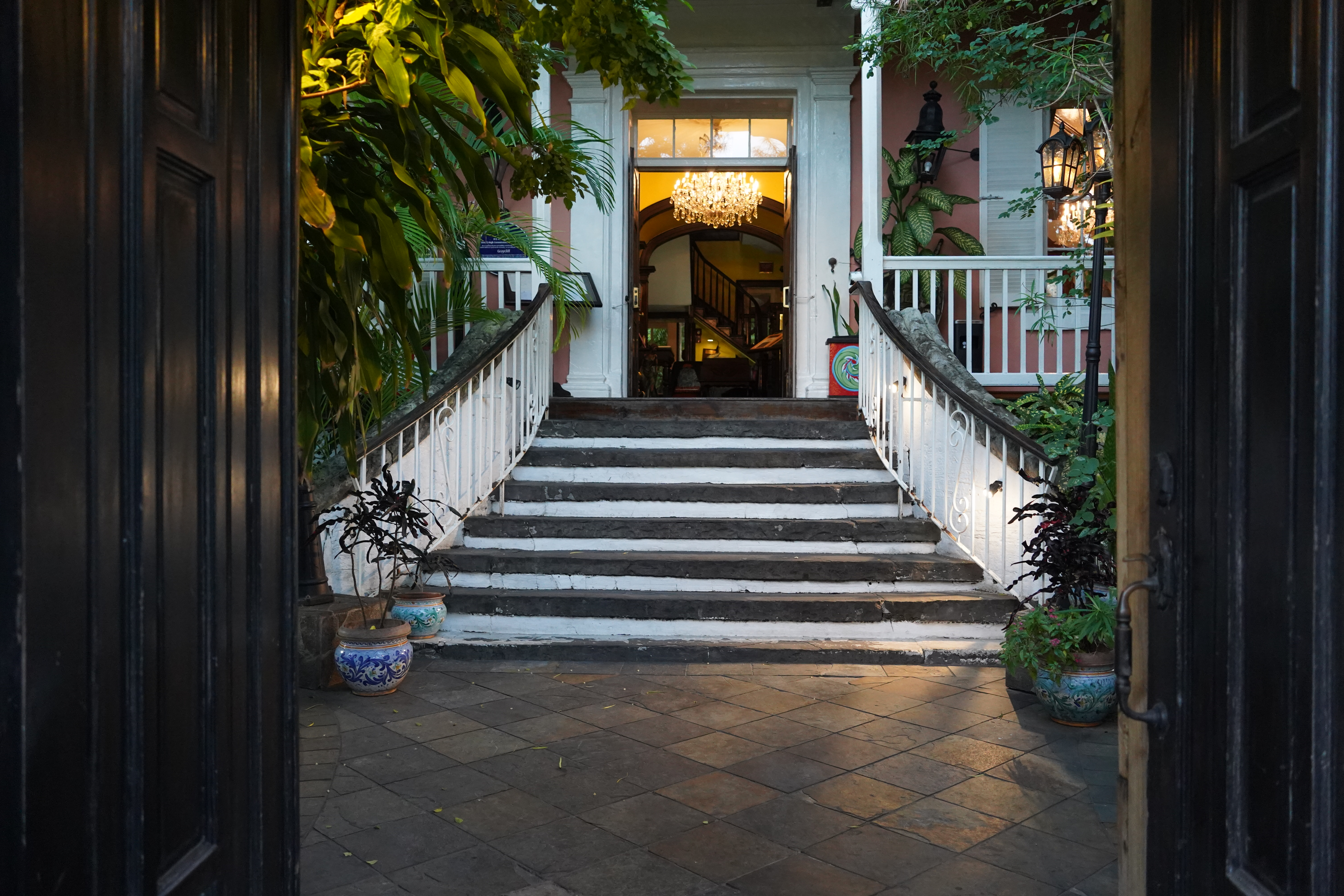
entrance to Graycliff Hotel

West Hill Street is a street in Nassau, Bahamas, and is known for its historic buildings and connections to Bahamaian culture.

The historic Graycliff Hotel is on West Hill Street.

People have reported West Hill Street to be haunted.
