= Christian Larsen =

Christian Larsen may refer to:

- Christian Larsen (rower), New Zealand rower
- Christian Larsen (boxer) (born 1947), Danish Olympic boxer
- Christian Magnus Sinding-Larsen (1866–1930), Norwegian physician and hospital director
- Christian Albrekt Larsen (born 1975), Danish professor in comparative welfare studies

== See also ==
- Chris Larsen, (born 1960), American business executive and angel investor
- Christian Larson (disambiguation)
