= Fort Charlotte (Nassau) =

Defensive fort in Nassau, Bahamas

Coordinates: 25°04′40″N 77°21′31″W

- Part of Nassau, Bahamas
- Nassau, The Bahamas
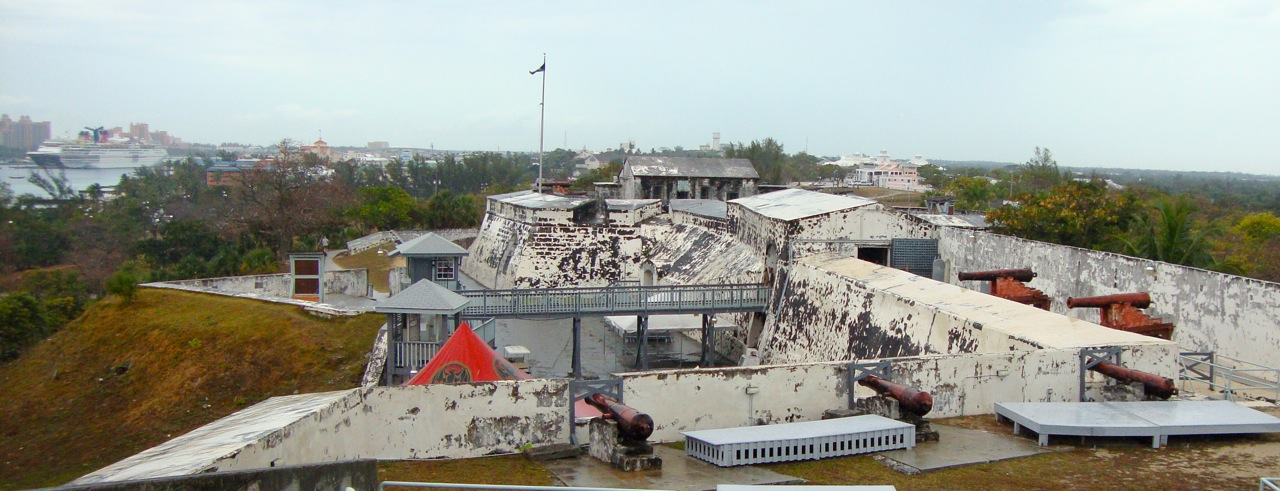
- Fort Charlotte, Nassau, The Bahamas

Site information
- Open to the public: Year Round

Site history
- Built: 1789
- Built by: John Murray, 4th Earl of Dunmore
- In use: 1789-??
- Materials: limestone

Fort Charlotte is a British-colonial era fort built on a hill overlooking the harbour of Nassau, the capital and largest city of the Bahamas. The fort sits a short walk west of downtown Nassau and the cruise ship terminal. The fort was constructed in the late 18th century by British colonial governor Lord Dunmore after the end of the American Revolutionary war. The fort has never been used in battle. It is one of several English forts that are still standing in Nassau. These forts were to be used as battle stations, to attack the invading Spaniards.

== See also ==
- Fort Montagu
- Fort Fincastle (Bahamas)
