= Arawak Cay =

Neighborhood of Nassau, Bahamas

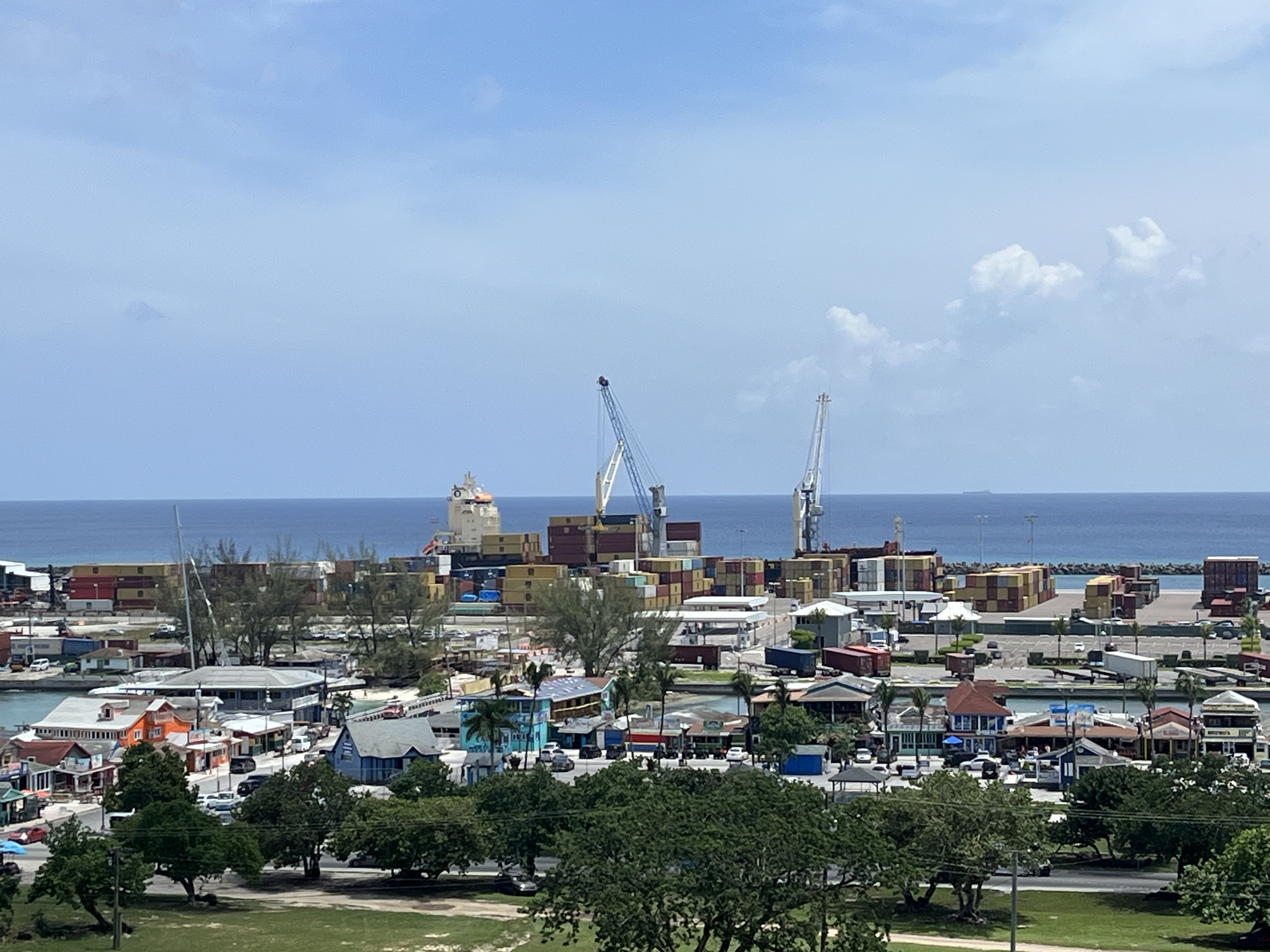

- Location within Bahamas

Geography
- Location: Atlantic Ocean
- Coordinates: 25°05′N 77°22′W
- Type: Cay
- Archipelago: Lucayan Archipelago

Administration
- The Bahamas

Arawak Cay, also referred to as Fish Fry, is a 100-acre man-made island in Nassau, The Bahamas. It was built from Nassau Harbour dredging spoils in 1969, and shipping operations began in the 1980s. In 2011, Nassau Container Port was built on Arawak Cay. Today, the area around the cay is known for its local eateries on West Bay Street, is about 15 minutes from downtown Nassau, and 25 minutes from Atlantis Paradise Island resort.
