= Lakindes Brown =

Bahamian beauty queen (born 1987)

Lakindes Lasheva Brown
- Born: Lakindes Brown; April 7, 1987 (age 39); Nassau, Bahamas
- Other name: Kendis Brown
- Height: 1.73 m (5 ft 8 in)
- Beauty pageant titleholder
- Title: Miss Bahamas Progress 2010; Miss Progress Ambiente (Environment) 2010; Miss Bahamas International 2011
- Hair color: Black
- Eye color: Brown
- Major competition: Miss International 2011

Lakindes Lasheva Brown (born April 7, 1987) is a Bahamian beauty queen who won the titles of Miss Bahamas Progress 2010, Miss Progress Ambiente 2010 and Miss Bahamas International 2011. She was born in Nassau, Bahamas.

== Beauty pageant competitions ==
Brown was a contestant in the Miss Bahamas Beauty Organization national beauty pageant Miss Bahamas Earth 2010, on August 8, 2010, and obtained the title of Miss Bahamas Progress 2010. On September 26, 2010, Brown competed in Taranto Italy and also won the title Miss Progress Ambiente (Environment) 2010 beating other contestants, making her one of only three Bahamians to ever place or win an international title in Bahamian pageant history. She also competed in the Miss Bahamas World Beauty pageant in 2007 as Miss Majestic Tours placing second runner up out of fifteen contestants.

On July 24, 2011, Brown won the Miss Bahamas International 2011 title and will be representing the Bahamas at the Miss International pageant held in Chengdu, China on November 7, 2011.
