= Revenue stamps of the Bahamas =

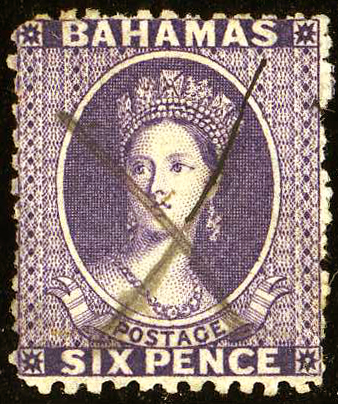
A fiscally used postage and revenue stamp of the Bahamas, 1863

Very few revenue stamps of the Bahamas have been issued, as most of the time dual-purpose postage and revenue stamps were used for fiscal purposes. They were used as such from around the 1860s to at least the 1950s. A couple of revenue-only impressed duty stamps embossed in vermilion ink are known used in the 1950s. Similar stamps but with colourless embossing might also exist.

A set of National Insurance stamps were issued in around the 1970s or 1980s. Only a single $7.95 stamp depicting the islands' national bird, the flamingo, has been recorded, but contributions were based on six wage groups so at least five other stamps were also issued. The National Insurance was established in the Bahamas on 7 October 1974, and the use of stamps to pay contributions ended in 1984–86.

In September 2013, a taxpaid stamp was issued to pay the excise tax on tobacco in accordance with the Excise Stamp (Tobacco Products) Control Act (No. 27 of 2013). The stamp depicts a flamingo and a bar code, and it must be affixed to the packaging of tobacco products such as cigarettes.

== See also ==
- Postage stamps and postal history of the Bahamas
