= Nassau Public Library =

Coordinates: 25.0765°N 77.3405°W

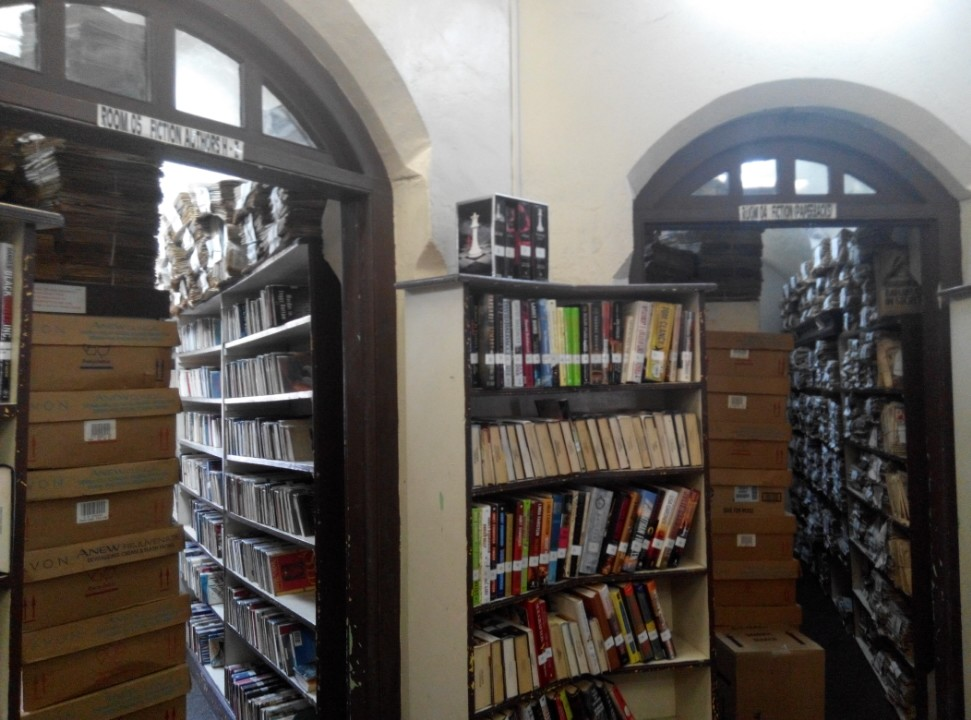
- Location: Nassau, The Bahamas
- Type: Public
- Established: 1837

The Nassau Public Library and Museum, in Nassau, is the largest and oldest of five libraries in the Bahamas. The library was founded in 1837, when the Bahamas Society for the Diffusion of Knowledge was combined with a reading society. The Nassau Public Library was made official in 1847 with the passing of the Nassau Public Library Act, making it among the oldest Public Libraries in the Commonwealth Caribbean.

Its building was once a colonial jail, dating back to 1797, when it became the first building in Parliament Square. "The building is said to have been inspired by the Old Powder Magazine in Williamsburg, Virginia." It was converted into a library in 1873. The small prison cells which once housed prisoners now contain old colonial documents, newspapers, books, charts, Arawak artifacts, and historic prints. "Since its conversion in 1837 from a hectic prison environment to that of a tranquil place of study, the library has seen an extensive increase in a variety of services, numerous technological advancements, vast expansion in study material, and many added special features all fully accessible to the general public."

== See also ==
- Fox Hill Prison
