= Nassau Container Port =

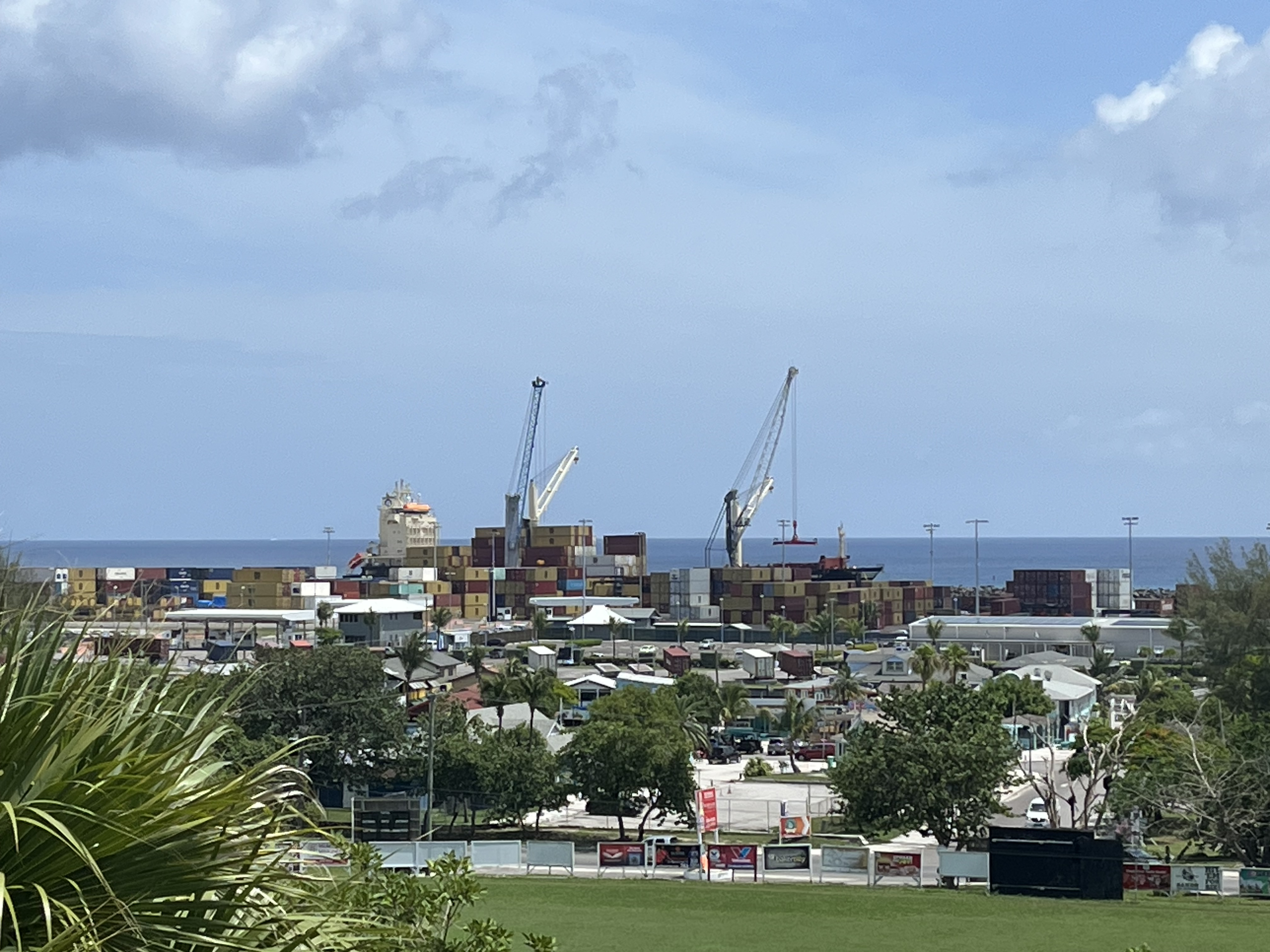
- View of Arawak Cay
- Interactive map of Nassau Container Port

Location
- Country: The Bahamas
- Location: P.O. Box SP-63958; Arawak Cay, Nassau
- Coordinates: 25.083°N 77.360°W
- UN/LOCODE: BSNAS

Details
- Built: 1969 (Island)
- Opened: 2011 (Facilities)
- Type of harbour: Container port
- Size: 56 acres
- No. of berths: 3
- Draft depth: 28 feet
- Motto: Connecting Nassau to the World

Statistics
- Annual cargo tonnage: 402,000 tons (2024)
- Website www.nassaucontainerport.com

Nassau Container Port is a major container port in Nassau, The Bahamas. 20% of Nassau Container Port port is owned by 11,000 members of the Bahamian public, 40% of the port is owned by the government of The Bahamas, and 40% is held by Arawak Cay Port Development Holdings Limited, a consortium of private investors from the shipping industry. Nassau Container Port is located on Arawak Cay, a man-made island that was built in 1969 from dredging spoils. Shipping operations from the island began in the 1980s, while the Nassau Container Port itself was completed in 2011.

Nassau Container Port can handle container, bulk, break bulk, and general cargo operations. Furthermore, the port has 60 reefer points, three Liebherr cranes, three mobile cranes, two container cranes, and five reach stacker. Around 402,000 tons of cargo are handled at Nassau Container Port annually, and the port is located in Downtown Nassau. In October 2022, 142 pounds of cocaine worth $1.6 million was discovered and confiscated by Bahamian police at the port.
