= Cheryl Bazard =

Bahamian diplomat, politician, lawyer

Bahamian Ambassador to Belgium
- Incumbent
- Assumed office 2022

Member of the Senate of the Bahamas
- In office 2012–2014

Personal details
- Born: Nassau, The Bahamas
- Party: Progressive Liberal Party
- Education: College of the Bahamas; University of Buckingham (LL.B); Thomas Jefferson School of Law (LL.M.)

Cheryl Bazard is a Bahamian lawyer, politician and diplomat. She is the former Bahamian Ambassador to Belgium and the European Union, and also served as a Senator from 2012 to 2014. Bazard now sits as Justice of the Supreme Court of the Commonwealth of The Bahamas. She was sworn in as Acting Justice on 11 March, 2025 and as substantive Justice in December, 2025.

== Early life and education ==
Bazard was born in Nassau, Bahamas. Bazard pursued a Associate's Degree in history at the College of the Bahamas. She continued her studies abroad, where she obtained her Bachelor of Laws degree from the University of Buckingham, in Buckinghamshire, England.

Bazard was admitted to the Bar of England & Wales and the Bahamas Bar in 1991.

Later, Bazard obtained a Master's Degree in Financial Compliance Risk Management from the Thomas Jefferson School of Law in California. She has also earned diplomas in Anti-Money Laundering and Compliance with distinction from the International Compliance Association in London.

== Professional career ==
Bazard served as counsel in the Office of the Attorney General from 1997 to 1998. She also served for a time as a stipendiary and circuit magistrate.

Bazard also worked in the financial sector, where she served as Legal Counsel, Corporate Secretary, and Regional Director of Compliance for CIBC and CIBC First Caribbean International Bank, as well as the Director of Compliance for Scotiabank (Bahamas) Limited. In 1999, Bazard, along with other compliance officers, founded the Bahamas Association of Compliance Officers (BACO) and she became its founding president. Bazard served a second non-consecutive term as president from 2018 to 2020. Her contributions to the financial services sector were acknowledged with awards, including Compliance Officer of the Year in 2002 and the Bahamas Financial Services Board's Professional Excellence Award in 2003.

In addition to her legal practice, Bazard has served as a lecturer at both the Eugene Dupuch Law School and the Bahamas Institute of Financial Services. In 2016, Bazard also served as Co-Executive Director of the "Vote Yes Bahamas" Campaign for the constitutional referendum on gender equality.

== Political career ==
In 2012, Bazard was appointed a Senator by Prime Minister Perry Christie and sworn in on 21 May 2012 in a ceremony at the Government House in Nassau. She resigned from the Senate in 2014. In 2017, she ran for Parliament for the Progressive Liberal Party party for the St. Barnabas constituency in the 2017 general election. However, she was not successful in her bid for the seat.

In 2022, Bazard was appointed the Bahamas' Ambassador to the Kingdom of Belgium and Mission to the European Union, receiving her letters of credentials on 18 October 2022.
