= Bay Street (Nassau) =

Street in Nassau, Bahamas

Coordinates: 25°04′41″N 77°20′28″W

Bay Street is a major street in Nassau, Bahamas and a center for politics, business, culture, and tourism in The Bahamas.

Because cruise ships present large numbers of tourists to The Bahamas onto Bay Street continuously, residents of Nassau and tourists to The Bahamas have different experiences of how they experience visits to Bay Street.

In the 1940s, the value of real estate on Bay Street was not particularly high, but by the end of the 1950s, purchasing land on Bay Street was very expensive.

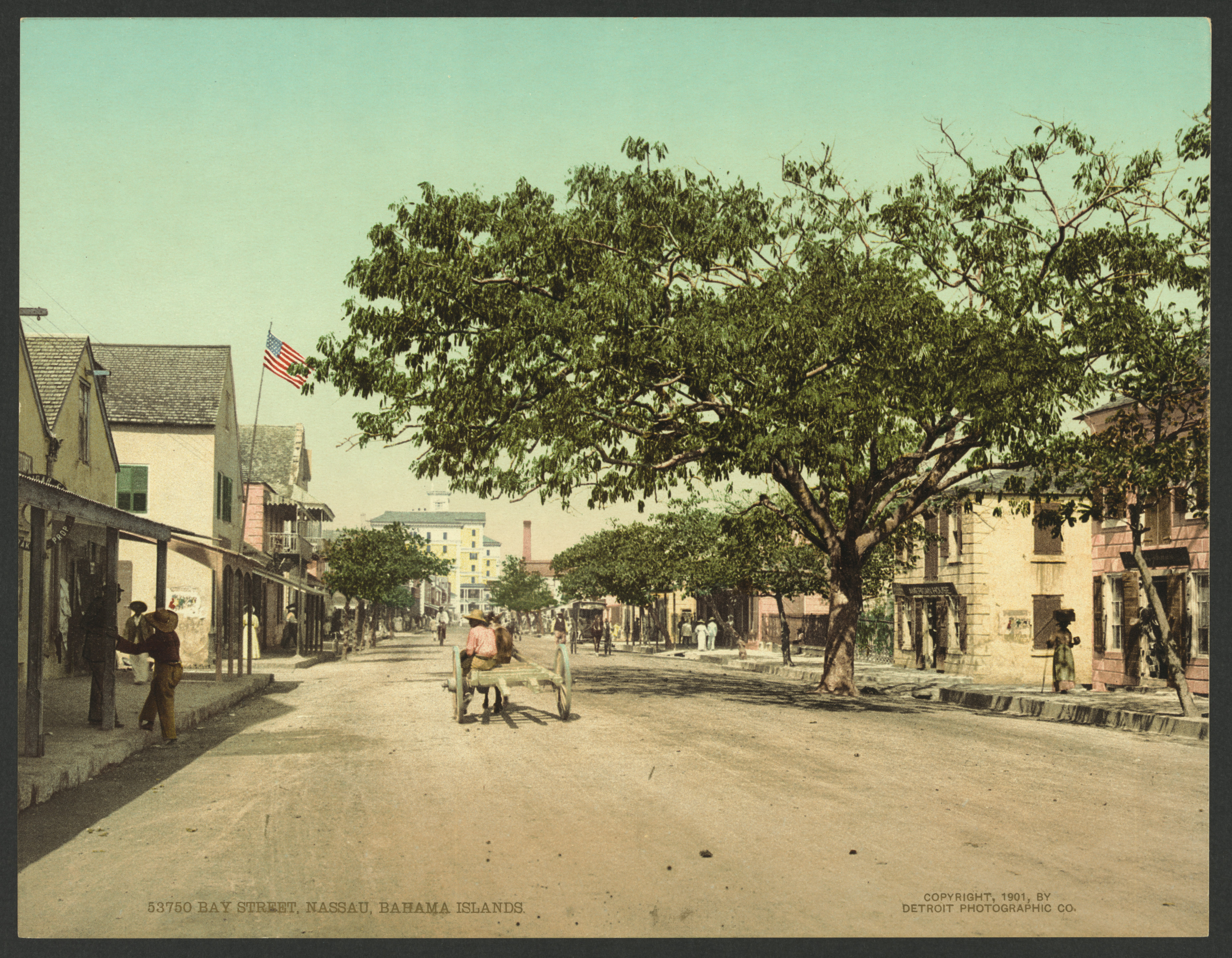
Bay Street in 1901

The location which is now Bay Street was developed at the founding of Nassau between 1648 and 1666, at which time the street went by its former name, "The Strand".
