= Queen's Staircase =

Landmark in Nassau, The Bahamas

- Staircase
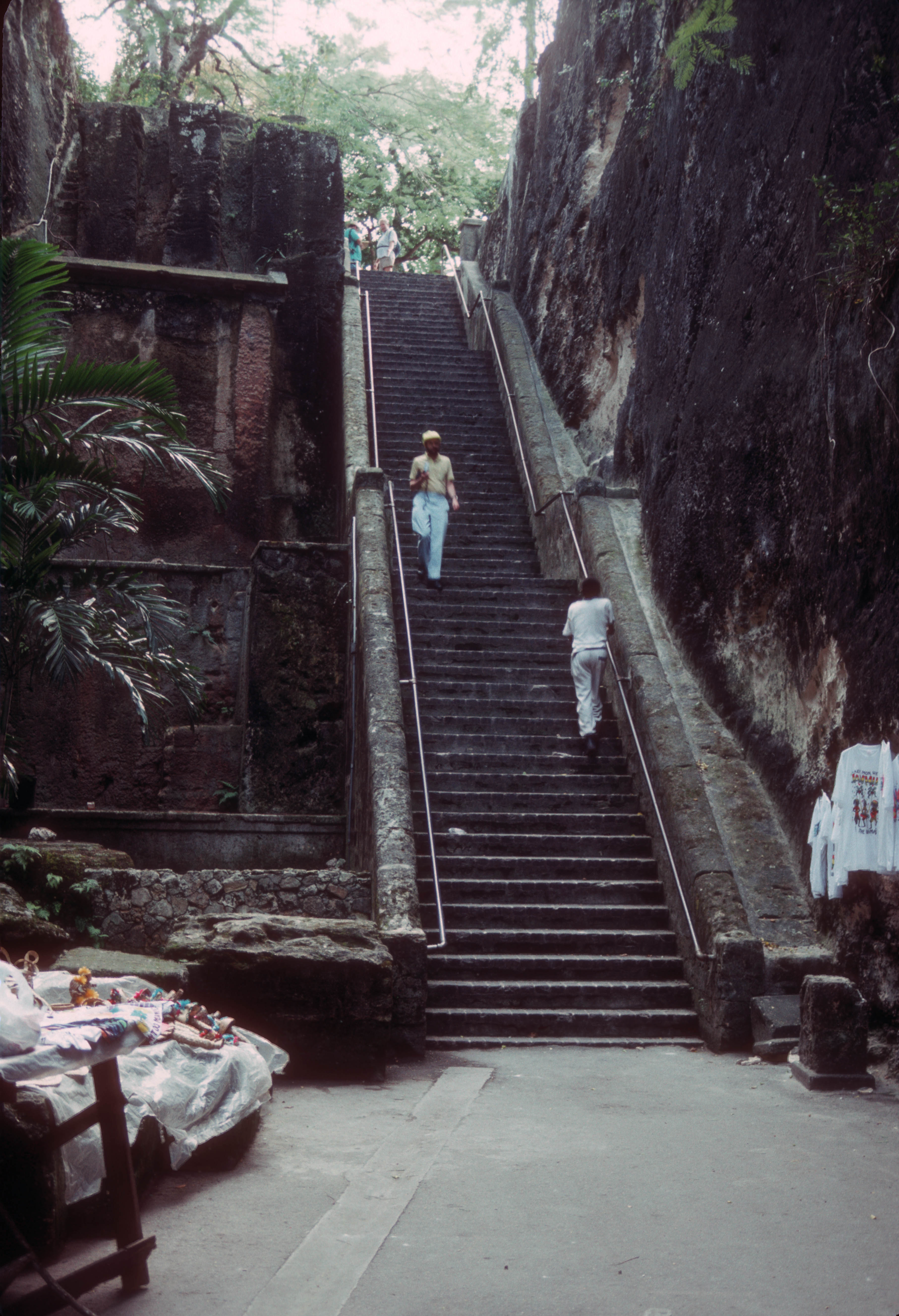
- Constructed: 1793–1794
- Opened: 1794
- Steps: 65 (originally 66)
- Height: 102 ft (31 m)
- Surface: Limestone
- Dedicated to: Queen Victoria
- Interactive map of Queen's Staircase
- Coordinates: 25°04′23.3″N 77°20′15.6″W

The Queen's Staircase (known locally as the 66 steps) is a walkway of 65 steps (originally 66) in Nassau, the capital city of The Bahamas. It was carved out of solid limestone by 600 slaves between 1793 and 1794 to create a direct route from Fort Fincastle to Nassau. It was later named for Queen Victoria of the United Kingdom of Great Britain and Ireland in the 19th century, and is now a popular landmark of Nassau.

== Description ==
The Queen's Staircase is located within the Fort Fincastle Historic Complex and leads to Fort Fincastle itself, which is situated partially on Bennet's Hill, the highest point of Nassau. Bennet's Hill is located in Downtown Nassau, next to Princess Margaret Hospital and the Grosvenor campus of the University of The Bahamas. The Queen's Staircase has a total rise of 102 feet (31 m) and a step-count of 65 (formerly 66). It has water cascading alongside its steps to a pool below. The base of the stairs leads to a walkway that goes between high stone walls, tropical plants and tropical trees.

== History ==
A group of 600 slaves began construction in 1793 on a staircase and road to connect Fort Fincastle – completed that same year – to Nassau below. With limited tools, the slaves were forced to carve into solid limestone to fabricate the stairs and road. The staircase was later named in the 19th century in honour of Queen Victoria of the United Kingdom of Great Britain and Ireland, who ended slavery in the British Empire. Although tour guides often claim that the number of steps correspond with the number of years Queen Victoria ruled, this is untrue; Queen Victoria reigned for a little under 64 years, from 1837 to 1901.

== See also ==
- Stairs § Notable sets of stairs
