= Christian Larson =

Christian Larson may refer to:

- Christian D. Larson (1874–1954), New Thought leader and teacher
- Christian Larson (director), Swedish film and music video director

== See also ==
- Christian Larsen (disambiguation)
- Chris Larson (disambiguation)
