= Christopher Larson =

Bahamian footballer

Personal information
- Date of birth: 1 October 1991 (age 35)
- Place of birth: Nassau, Bahamas
- Height: 6 ft 0 in (1.83 m)
- Position: Midfielder

Youth career
- 2010–2013: CUA Cardinals

Senior career*
Years	Team	Apps	(Gls)
2013–	Bears		

International career^{‡}
2011–	Bahamas	3	(0)
- * Club domestic league appearances and goals as of 14 September 2011 ‡ National team caps and goals as of 2 April 2016

Christopher Larson (born 1 October 1991) is a Bahamian international footballer who played college soccer for The Catholic University of America, as a midfielder.

== Playing career ==
=== Club ===
Larson played college soccer in the United States for the Catholic University Cardinals. He scored six goals in 63 games for the Cardinals.

=== International ===
He made his international debut for Bahamas in a July 2011 FIFA World Cup qualification match against the Turks and Caicos Islands , and has appeared in FIFA World Cup qualifying matches.
