= Christian Albrekt Larsen =

Danish professor

- Born: 3. October 1975; Denmark
- Citizenship: Denmark
- Education: Aalborg University
- Scientific career
- Fields: Comparative welfare studies
- Workplaces: CENTRE FOR COMPARATIVE WELFARE STUDIES

Christian Albrekt Larsen is a Danish professor employed at Aalborg University, where he is involved in comparative welfare studies. He works on a daily basis at the CENTRE FOR COMPARATIVE WELFARE STUDIES (CCWS).

== Education ==
Christian Albrekt Larsen received his master's degree in politics and administration from Aalborg University in 2000. In 2005 he was awarded a PhD degree in Political Science, also at Aalborg University. Christian Albrekt Larsen was awarded the Danish higher doctoral degree in sociology (Dr. scient. soc.) in 2014.

== Background and Scientific Contributions ==
Christian Albrekt Larsen's research has focused primarily on the way in which open economies and multicultural societies maintain their cohesiveness. His research results suggest that the Nordic welfare model still holds the best response to this challenge.

In his book "The institutional logic of welfare attitudes: How welfare regimes influence public support " (Ashgate 2006, PhD thesis) Christian Albrekt Larsen examined how institutions in universal welfare systems create and maintain support for the fight against poverty. His book "The rise and fall of social cohesion. Constructing and de-constructing social trust in the US, UK, Sweden and Denmark" (Oxford University Press, 2013, higher doctoral thesis) examined how the institutional structures also affect the mutual trust between people. This book is based on empirical data from Denmark, Sweden, United Kingdom and United States in the shape of questionnaire surveys regarding trust, economic inequality and perceptions of marginalised groups such as poor people and immigrants. Moreover, it includes a unique study of how poverty and the poor were described in Danish, Swedish and British media in the period from 2004 to 2009.

In a Danish context, Christian Albrekt Larsen has addressed the following topics:

- Long-term unemployment and the importance of networks in the labour market (two books)
- National identity and the attitude to immigration (two books)
- Welfare reforms and the underlying politics (one book)

Research grants:

- 2015 - 2018: Migrants’ welfare state attitudes, Danish PI (NORFACE grant 3,134,250 kr.).
- 2015 - 2018: Welfare State Futures, Danish CO-PI (NORFACE grant 2,251,605 kr.).
- 2011 - 2015: The Nordic Models and its contemporary inhabitants. Exploring Stability and Change from a micro perspective. National Sapere Aude grant for young elite research leader, PI (National Research Council 4,900,000 kr.).
- 2008 - 2011: Social capital and underclass phenomena. PI (Velux Foundation 1,600.000 kr.).
- 2005 - 2009: Economic incentives and barriers among long-term unemployed. The Danish strategic welfare research programme, member of applying research group (Ministry of Social Affairs and Ministry of Employment).
- 2007 - 2009: Danish election study, member of applying research group (National Research Council).
- 2005 - 2008: Danish Welfare Architecture in a Comparative Perspective: Challenges, Constraints, Possibilities, member of the applying research group (National Research Council).

Christian Albrekt Larsen is associated with the following national and international networks:

- 2013 - : Member of the Sino-Danish Center, www.sinodanishcenter.com.
- 2013 - : Member of the Swiss National Centre of Competence LIVES, in Research, www.lives-nccr.ch/en
- 2006 – 2011: Member of the Network of Excellence (NoE) of the Sixth Framework Programme (FP6) on "Reconciling Work and Welfare in Europe (RECWOWE)".
- 2007 - 2011: Member of the Nordic Centre of Excellence of the NordForsk programme on "Reassessing the Nordic Welfare Mode".
- 2000 - : Member of the Danish International Social Survey Programme (ISSP).
- 2009 - 2011: Member of the Board of Directors of the National Association for Political Science.

== Awards ==
- Teacher of the year at Aalborg University 2009
- Sapere Aude: Head of research at the Danish Council for Independent Research 2010
- Fulbright Grant 2015-2016
- Member of the Danish Council for Independent Research / Society and Business (FSE)

== Extra References ==
CV:
