= Nassau, Bahamas =

Capital and largest city of The Bahamas

Nassau
- Capital city
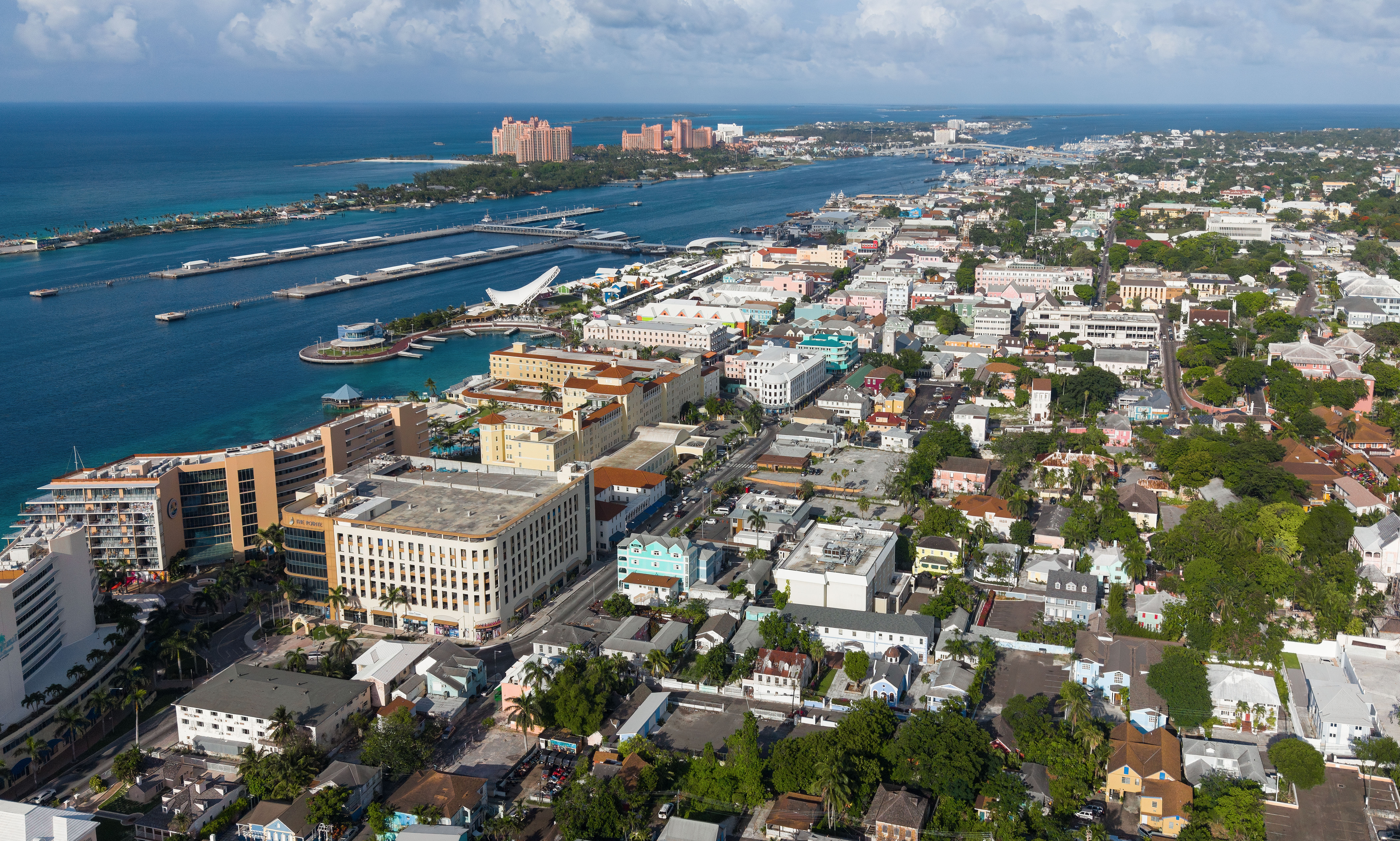
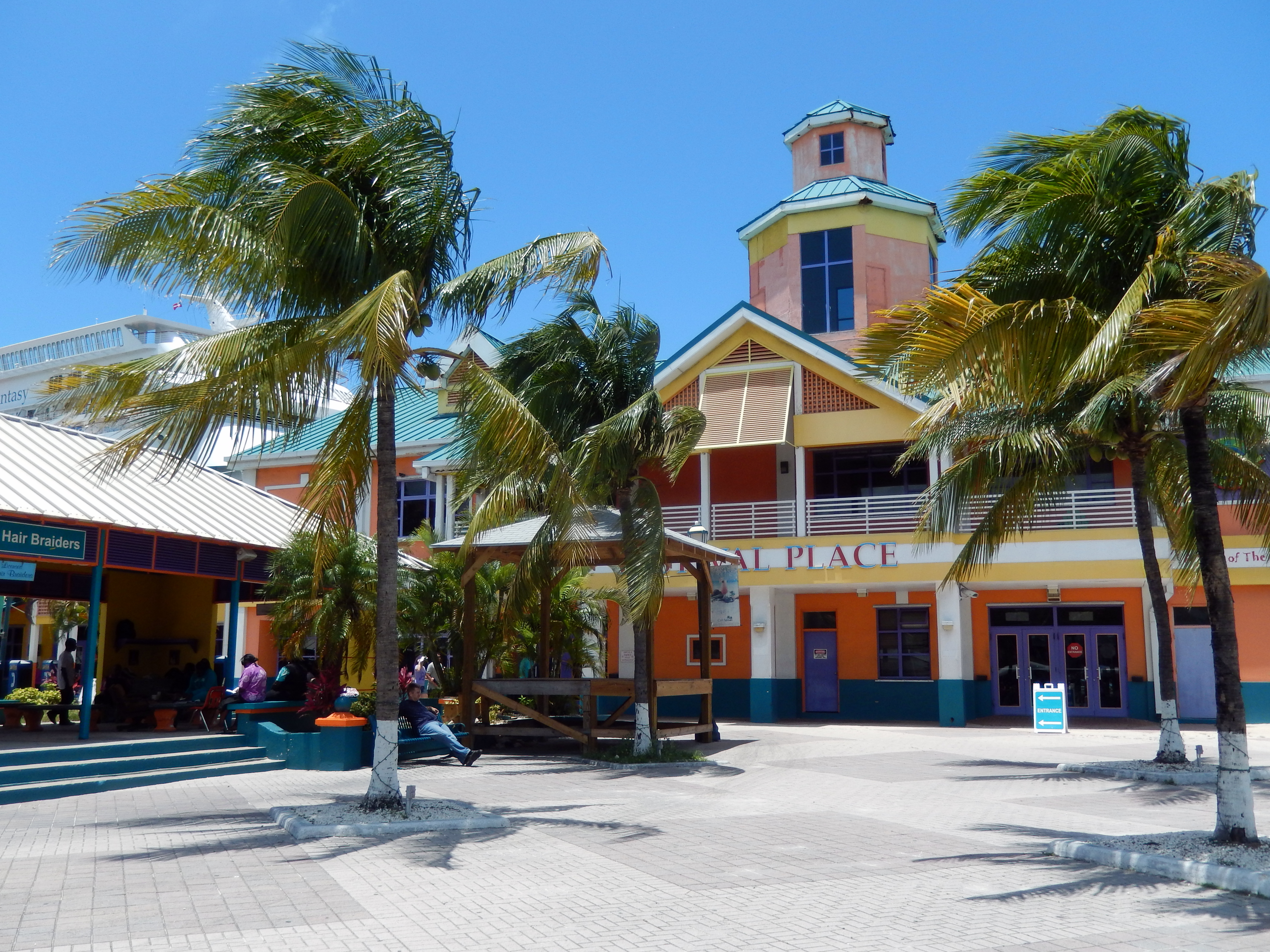
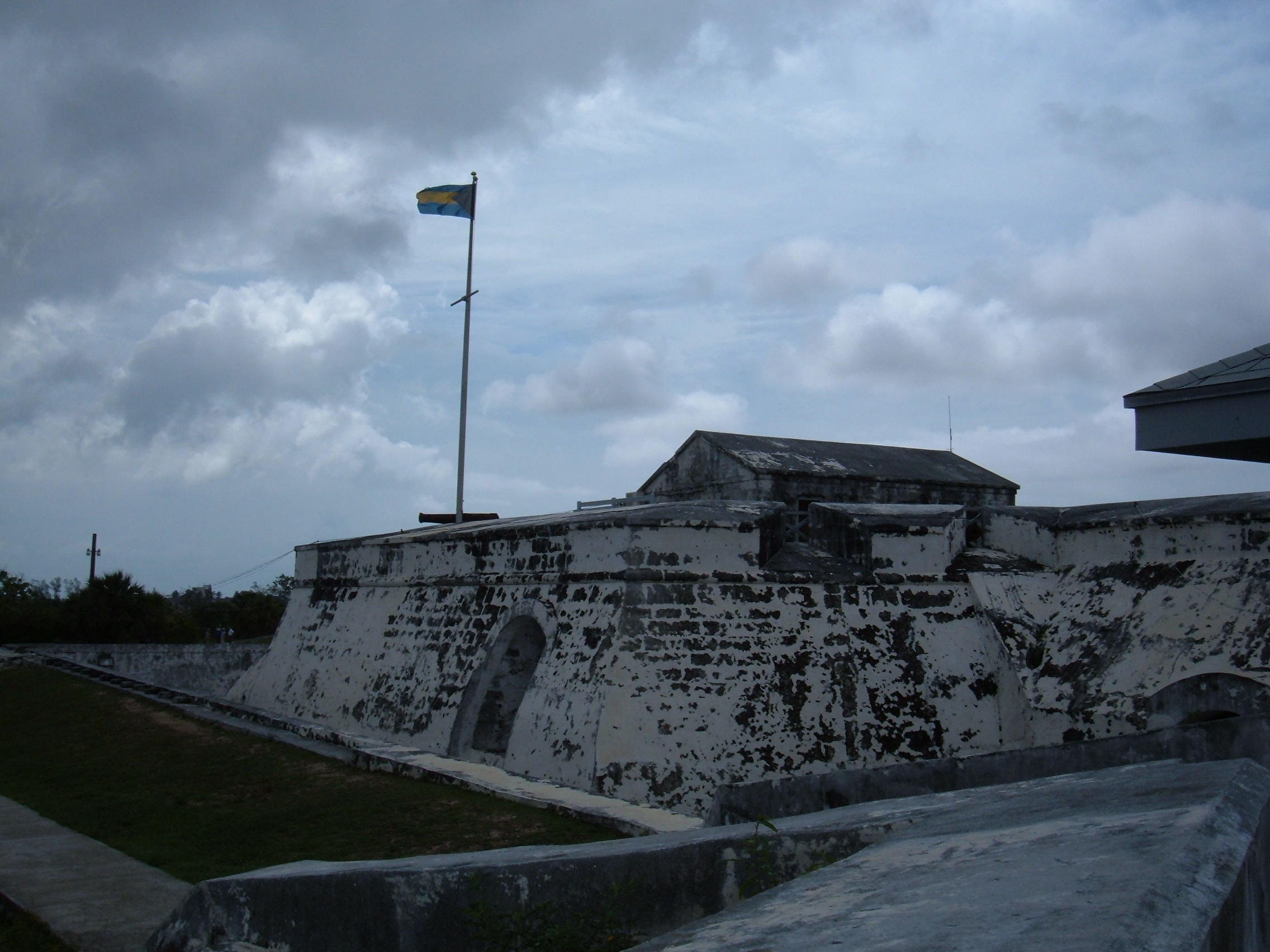
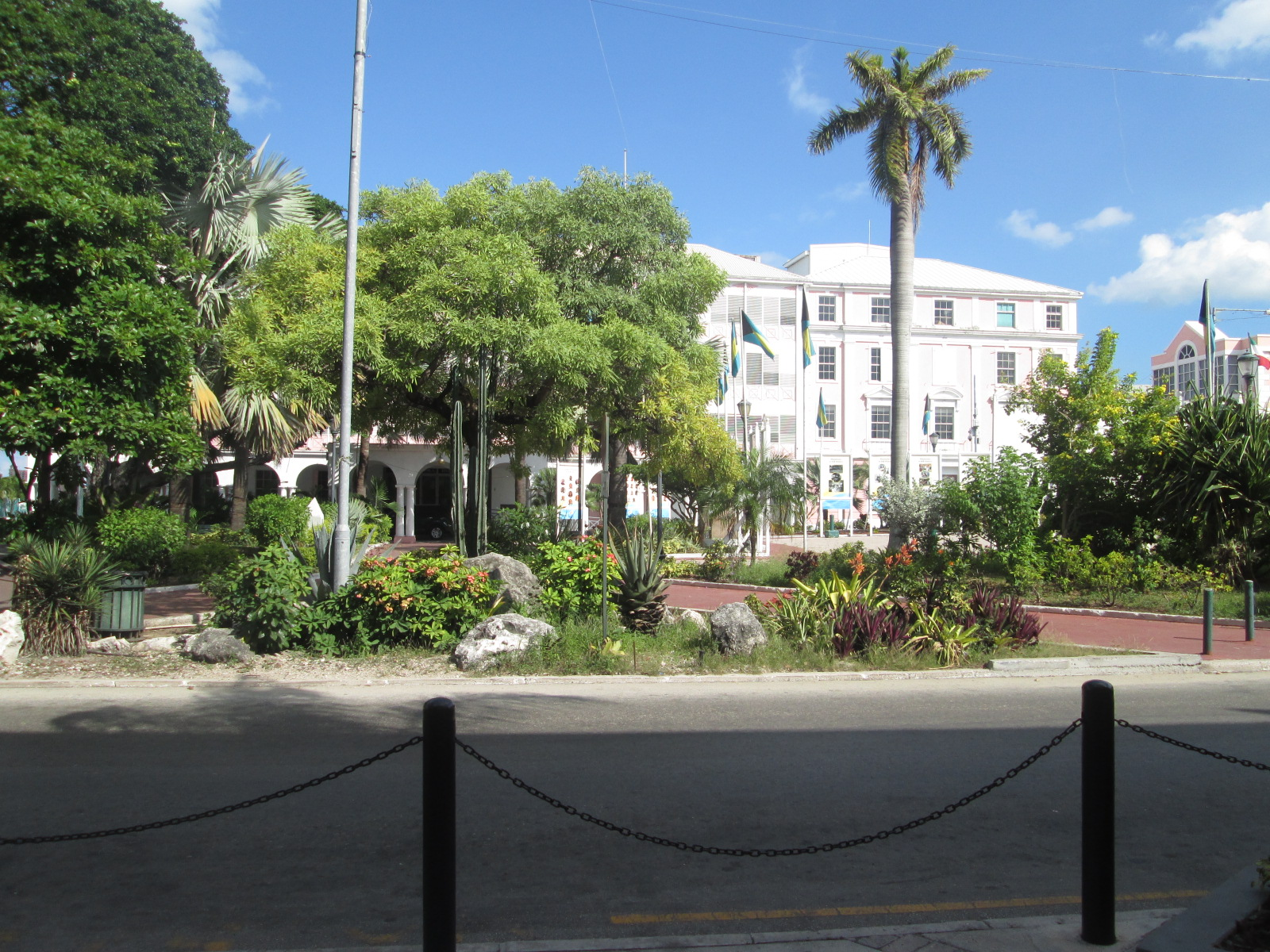
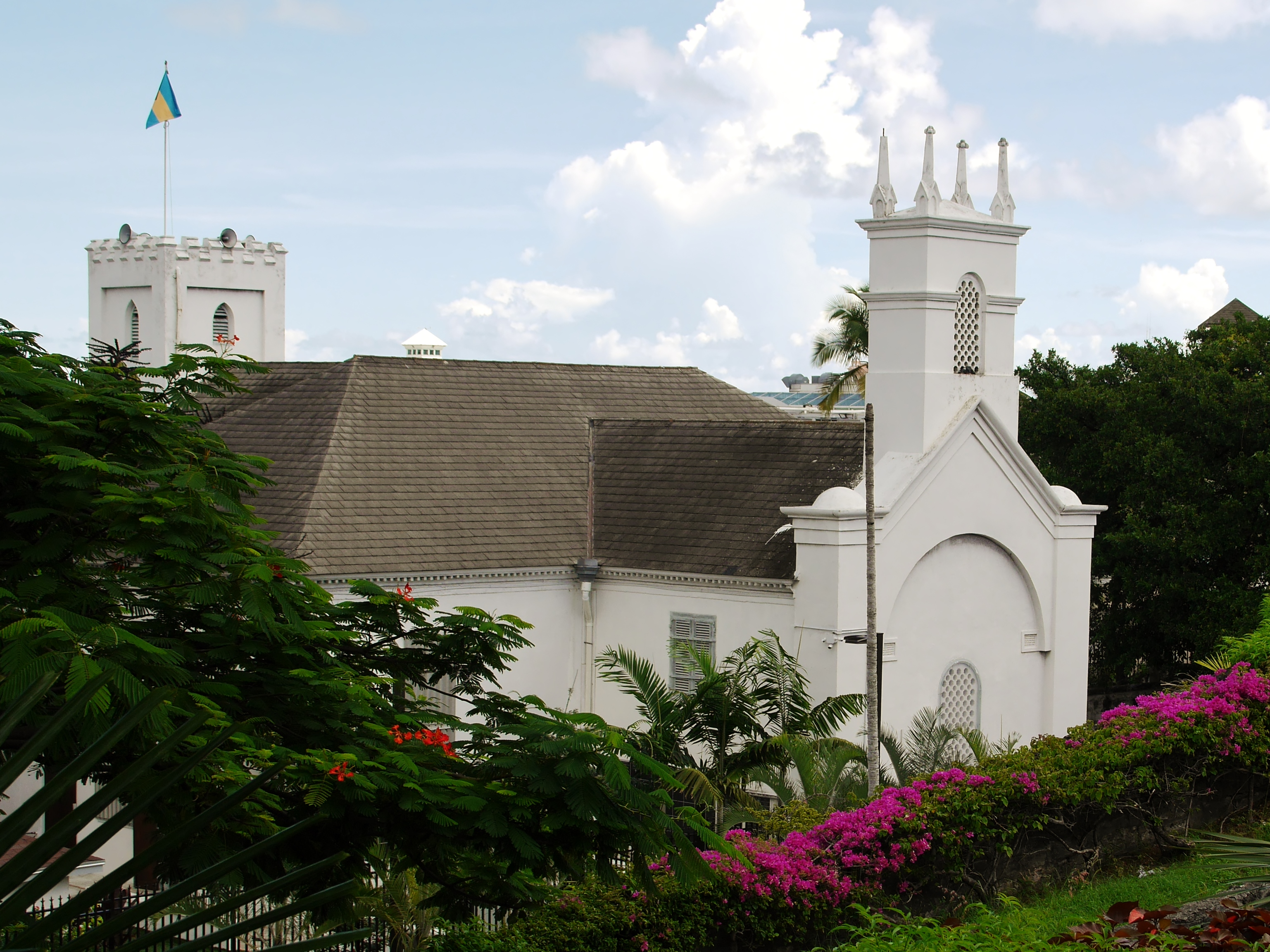
- Top: Nassau skyline; Middle: Nassau Terminal Royal Place, Fort Charlotte; Bottom: Parliament Square, Christ Church Cathedral

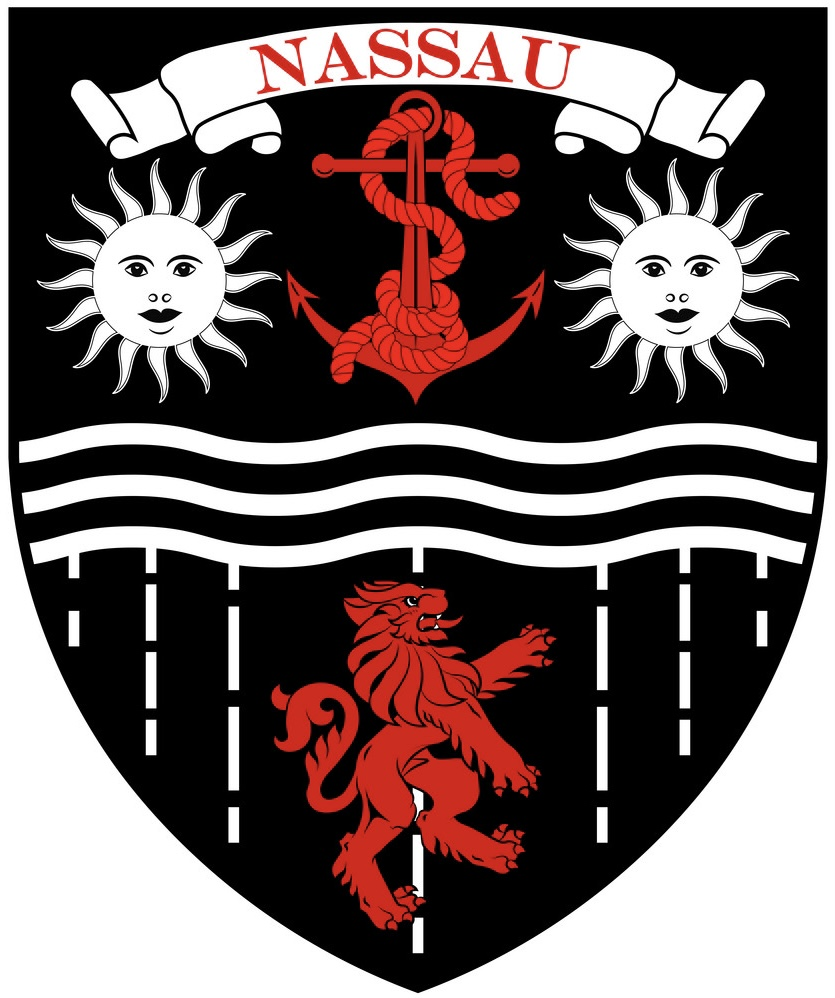
- Seal
- Nickname: Isle of June
- Location within Bahamas Location within the Caribbean Location within North America
- Coordinates: 25°04′41″N 77°20′19″W
- Country: The Bahamas
- Island: New Providence
- Founded and Rebuilt/Renamed: Founded in 1670 as Charles Town, rebuilt as Nassau in 1695

Area (for New Providence)
  - Total: 210 km^{2} (80 sq mi)
- Elevation: 10 m (33 ft)

Population (2022)
  - Total: 296,732
  - Rank: 1st in Bahamas
  - Density: 1,400/km^{2} (3,700/sq mi)
- Time zone: UTC−05:00 (EST)
  - Summer (DST): UTC−04:00 (EDT)
- Area code: 242

Nassau (/ˈnæsɔː/ NASS-aw) is the capital and largest city of the Bahamas. It is on the island of New Providence, which has a population of 296,522, 74.26% of the country's total population. Nassau is commonly defined as a primate city, dwarfing all other towns in the country. It is the centre of commerce, education, law, administration, and media of the country.

Lynden Pindling International Airport, the major airport for the Bahamas, is located about 16 kilometres (9.9 mi) west of the city centre of Nassau, and has daily flights to and from major cities in Canada, the Caribbean, the United Kingdom and the United States. Nassau is the site of the House of Assembly and various judicial departments and was considered historically to be a stronghold of pirates. The city was named in honour of William III of England, Prince of Orange-Nassau.

Nassau's modern growth began in the late eighteenth century, with the influx of thousands of Loyalists and the people they enslaved to the Bahamas following the American War of Independence. Many of them settled in Nassau and eventually came to outnumber the original inhabitants.

As the population of Nassau grew, so did its populated areas. Today, the city dominates the entire island. However, until the post-Second World War era, the outer suburbs scarcely existed. Most of New Providence was uncultivated bush until Loyalists were resettled there following the American Revolutionary War; they established several plantations, such as Clifton and Tusculum. Slaves were imported as labour.

After the British abolished the international slave trade in 1807, they resettled thousands of Africans liberated from slave ships by the Royal Navy on New Providence (at Adelaide Village and Gambier Village), along with other islands such as Grand Bahama, Exuma, Abaco and Inagua. In addition, slaves freed from American ships, such as the slave ship Creole in November 1841, were allowed to settle there. The largest concentration of Africans historically lived in the "Over-the-Hill" suburbs of Grants Town and Bain Town to the south of the city of Nassau, while most of the inhabitants of European descent lived on the island's northern coastal ridges.

== History ==
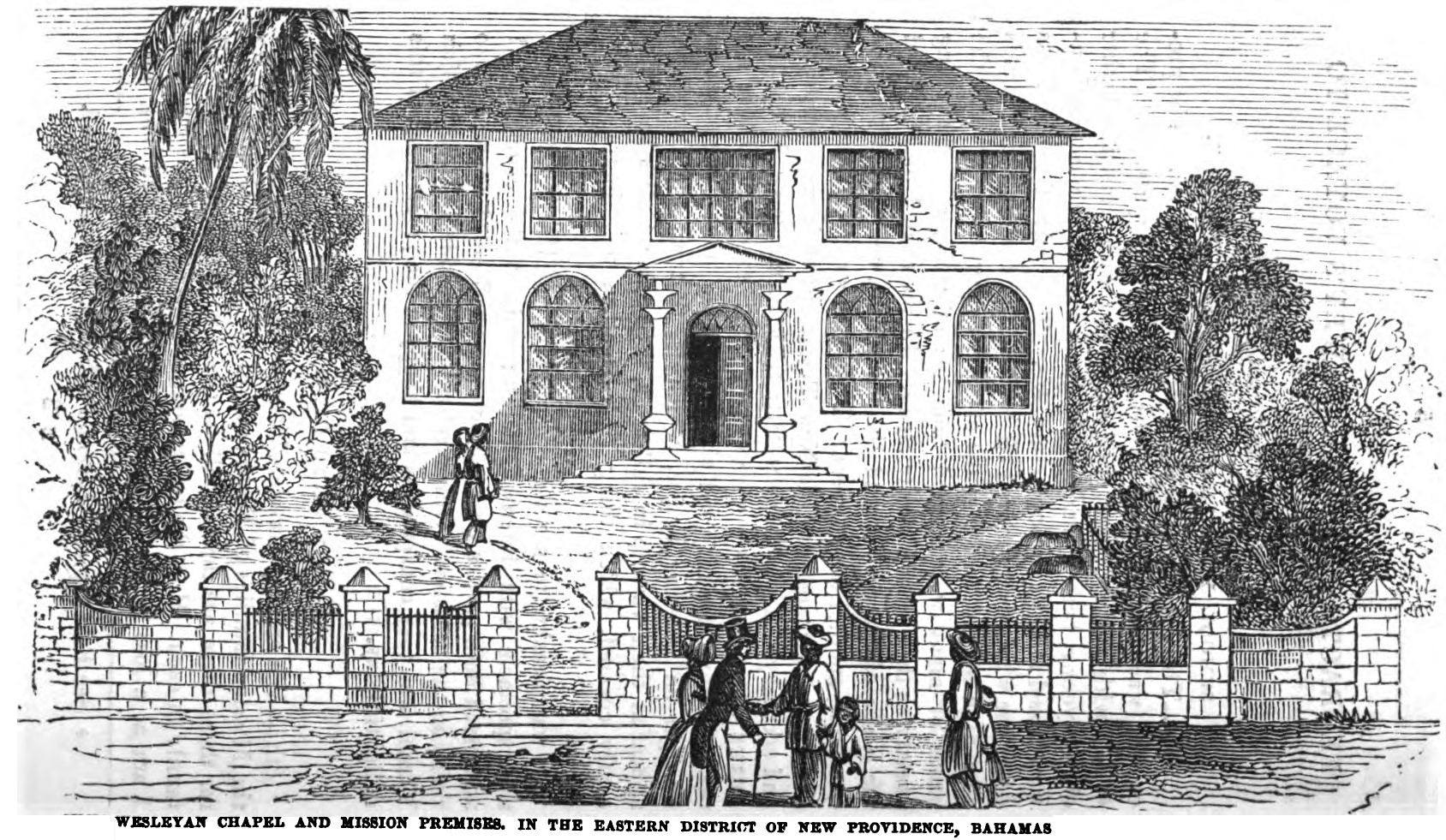
Drawing of the Wesleyan Chapel, c. 1849

The town that would be called Nassau was founded in 1670 by British noblemen who brought British settlers with them to New Providence. They built a fort, and named it Charles Town in honour of England's King Charles II. During this time there were frequent wars with the Spanish, and Charles Town was used as a base for privateering against them. In 1684 the town was burned to the ground during the Raid on Charles Town. It was rebuilt in 1695 under Governor Nicholas Trott and renamed Nassau in honour of King William III, who belonged to a branch of the House of Nassau. William was the Dutch Stadtholder (stadhouder in Dutch), and, from 1689, the King of England, Scotland and Ireland. The name Nassau ultimately derives from the town of Nassau in Germany.

Lacking effective governors after Trott, Nassau fell on hard times. In 1703, Spanish and French allied forces briefly occupied Nassau. More so, Nassau suffered greatly during the War of Spanish Succession and witnessed Spanish incursions during 1703, 1704 and 1706. From 1703 to 1718, there was no legitimate governor in the colony. Thomas Walker was the island's last remaining appointed official and although evidence is scarce, it appears that he was acting in the role of deputy governor upon Benjamin Hornigold's arrival in 1713. By this time, the sparsely settled Bahamas had become a pirate haven known as New Providence. The Governor of Bermuda stated that there were over 1,000 pirates in Nassau and that they outnumbered the mere hundred inhabitants of the town. They proclaimed Nassau a pirate republic, recognising the island's prosperous state in which it offered fresh fruit, meat and water and plenty of protection amid its waterways. Nassau's harbour was tailor-made for defence and it could take around 500 vessels, though it was too shallow to accept large battleships. Benjamin Hornigold, along with his great rival Henry Jennings, became the unofficial overlord of a veritable pirate republic which played host to the self-styled Flying Gang. Other pirates of note that spent time in Nassau included Charles Vane, Thomas Barrow (who declared himself "Governor of New Providence"), John Rackham, Anne Bonny, Mary Read, and the infamous Edward Teach, better known as "Blackbeard".

In 1718, the British government sought to regain control of the islands and appointed Captain Woodes Rogers as Royal governor. He successfully clamped down on the pirates, reformed the civil administration, and restored commerce. Rogers cleaned up Nassau and rebuilt the fort, using his own wealth to try to overcome problems. In 1720, the Spanish attacked Nassau but failed to capture the town and the island.

During the wars in the Thirteen Colonies, Nassau experienced an economic boom. With funds from privateering, a new fort, street lights and over 2300 sumptuous houses were built and Nassau was extended. In addition to this, mosquito breeding swamps were filled.

In 1776, the Battle of Nassau resulted in a brief occupation by American Continental Marines during the American War of Independence, where the marines staged their first amphibious raid on Fort Montague after attempting to sneak up on Fort Nassau. In 1778 after an overnight invasion, American raiders led by Captain Rathbun, left with ships, gunpowder and military stores after stopping in Nassau for only two weeks. In 1782, Spain captured Nassau for the last time when Don Juan de Cagigal, governor-general of Cuba, attacked New Providence with 5,000 men. In April 1783, Andrew Deveaux, an American Loyalist who resettled on the island, set forth and recaptured the island for the British Crown.

Lord Dunmore governed the colony from 1787 to 1796. He oversaw the construction of Fort Charlotte and Fort Fincastle in Nassau.

During the American Civil War, Nassau served as a port for blockade runners making their way to and from ports along the southern Atlantic Coast for continued trade with the Confederacy.

In the 1920s and 1930s, Nassau profited from Prohibition in the United States.

During the Cuban Revolution of 1959, tourism further benefited due to the restrictions imposed on American citizens visiting Cuba. Today, Nassau's location close to the United States and ties between the U.S. and the Bahamas make it a common tourist destination.

== Geography ==
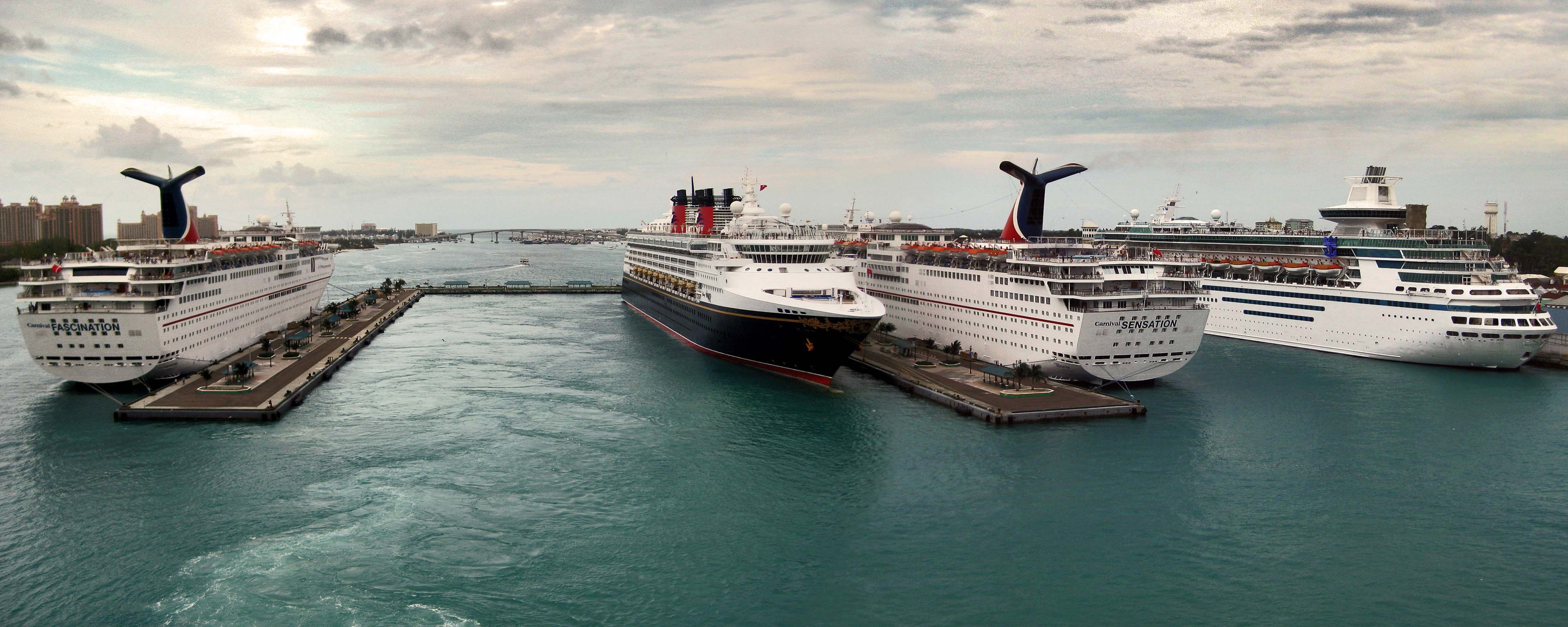
Prince George Wharf in Nassau Harbour. Ships from left to right are Carnival Fascination, Disney Magic, Carnival Sensation, and Majesty of the Seas.

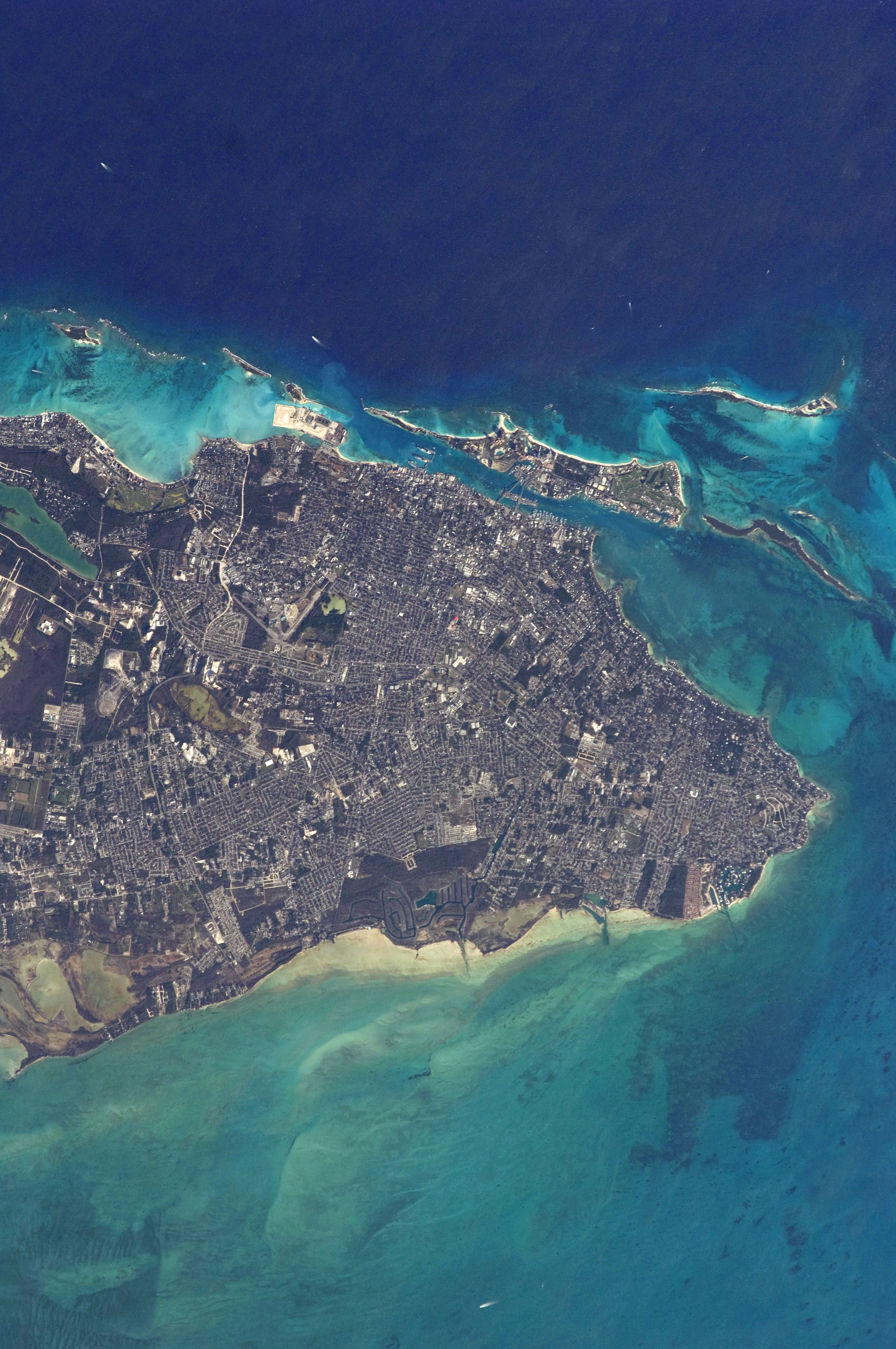
Satellite view of Nassau and Paradise Island

Located on New Providence Island, Nassau's harbour has a blend of old world and colonial architecture, and a busy port. The tropical climate and natural environment of the Bahamas have made Nassau an attractive tourist destination.

Nassau developed directly behind the port area. New Providence provides 200 km^{2} of relatively flat and low-lying land intersected by low ridges (none of which restricted settlement). In the centre of the island there are several shallow lakes that are tidally connected.

The city's proximity to the United States (290 kilometres or 180 miles east-southeast of Miami, Florida) has contributed to its popularity as a holiday resort, especially after the United States imposed a ban on travel to Cuba in 1963. The Atlantis resort on nearby Paradise Island accounts for more tourist arrivals to the city than any other hotel property of Nassau. The mega-resort employs over 6,000 Bahamians, and is the largest employer outside of the government.

=== Climate ===
Nassau has a tropical monsoon climate (Köppen: Am), bordering on a tropical savanna climate (Köppen: Aw), with hot wet summers, and mild dry winters. Temperatures are relatively consistent throughout the course of the year. During the wet season from May through October, average daytime high temperatures are 86–90 °F (30–32 °C), while during the dry season from November through April daytime temperatures are between 77 and 81 °F (25 and 27 °C), rarely falling below 59 °F (15 °C).

Climate data for Nassau (Lynden Pindling International Airport) 1991–2020, elevation: 7 metres or 23 feet, extremes 1961–present
Month	Jan	Feb	Mar	Apr	May	Jun	Jul	Aug	Sep	Oct	Nov	Dec	Year
Record high °C (°F)	31.5 (88.7)	31.8 (89.2)	33.0 (91.4)	34.5 (94.1)	35.3 (95.5)	36.5 (97.7)	36.0 (96.8)	35.9 (96.6)	35.2 (95.4)	34.5 (94.1)	33.4 (92.1)	31.7 (89.1)	36.5 (97.7)
Mean daily maximum °C (°F)	26.1 (78.9)	26.6 (79.9)	27.2 (80.9)	28.7 (83.7)	30.2 (86.4)	31.8 (89.2)	32.7 (90.9)	32.8 (91.0)	32.2 (89.9)	30.6 (87.0)	28.3 (82.9)	26.8 (80.3)	29.5 (85.1)
Daily mean °C (°F)	22.2 (71.9)	22.4 (72.4)	23.1 (73.6)	24.6 (76.3)	26.2 (79.2)	28.1 (82.5)	28.9 (84.1)	28.9 (84.1)	28.3 (82.9)	27.1 (80.7)	24.7 (76.4)	23.2 (73.7)	25.6 (78.2)
Mean daily minimum °C (°F)	18.2 (64.8)	18.5 (65.3)	19.1 (66.4)	21.0 (69.8)	22.4 (72.3)	24.2 (75.6)	25.0 (77.0)	25.0 (77.0)	24.7 (76.4)	23.6 (74.5)	21.2 (70.1)	19.6 (67.2)	21.9 (71.4)
Record low °C (°F)	5.2 (41.4)	7.7 (45.9)	7.0 (44.6)	9.2 (48.6)	13.1 (55.6)	15.0 (59.0)	17.9 (64.2)	18.0 (64.4)	15.3 (59.5)	13.3 (55.9)	10.6 (51.1)	5.3 (41.5)	5.2 (41.4)
Average precipitation mm (inches)	45 (1.76)	48 (1.90)	54 (2.13)	74 (2.91)	139 (5.48)	220 (8.66)	158 (6.23)	211 (8.31)	196 (7.70)	151 (5.93)	87 (3.41)	43 (1.70)	1,426 (56.12)
Average precipitation days (≥ 1.0 mm)	7	5	6	7	10	15	16	18	17	13	9	7	130
Average relative humidity (%)	73.2	74.5	73.3	75.0	78.4	81.0	79.3	79.6	79.9	78.1	73.8	74.9	76.7
Average dew point °C (°F)	18.0 (64.4)	17.9 (64.3)	18.2 (64.7)	19.7 (67.4)	21.8 (71.3)	24.1 (75.4)	24.7 (76.4)	24.8 (76.7)	24.5 (76.1)	23.1 (73.5)	20.2 (68.4)	19.2 (66.5)	21.3 (70.4)
Mean monthly sunshine hours	226	224	251	282	282	240	267	260	222	236	219	211	2,920
Percentage possible sunshine	68	71	68	74	68	59	64	65	60	66	67	64	66
Average ultraviolet index	6	8	10	11	11	11	11	11	10	8	6	5	9
Source 1: Bahamas Department of Meteorology
Source 2: Weather.Directory and Weather Atlas (uv index)

Climate data for Nassau (Lynden Pindling International Airport), elevation: 7 m or 23 ft, 1961–1990 normals and extremes
Month	Jan	Feb	Mar	Apr	May	Jun	Jul	Aug	Sep	Oct	Nov	Dec	Year
Record high °C (°F)	30.2 (86.4)	31.5 (88.7)	31.0 (87.8)	32.9 (91.2)	33.5 (92.3)	34.0 (93.2)	34.1 (93.4)	35.0 (95.0)	34.0 (93.2)	33.2 (91.8)	32.2 (90.0)	30.4 (86.7)	35.0 (95.0)
Mean daily maximum °C (°F)	25.2 (77.4)	25.3 (77.5)	26.5 (79.7)	27.7 (81.9)	29.2 (84.6)	30.7 (87.3)	31.7 (89.1)	31.8 (89.2)	31.3 (88.3)	29.7 (85.5)	27.7 (81.9)	25.9 (78.6)	28.6 (83.4)
Daily mean °C (°F)	21.1 (70.0)	21.1 (70.0)	22.2 (72.0)	23.4 (74.1)	25.3 (77.5)	26.9 (80.4)	27.9 (82.2)	27.9 (82.2)	27.3 (81.1)	25.9 (78.6)	23.8 (74.8)	21.9 (71.4)	24.6 (76.2)
Mean daily minimum °C (°F)	16.7 (62.1)	16.9 (62.4)	17.7 (63.9)	19.0 (66.2)	21.0 (69.8)	22.9 (73.2)	23.7 (74.7)	23.8 (74.8)	23.6 (74.5)	22.2 (72.0)	20.0 (68.0)	17.7 (63.9)	20.4 (68.8)
Record low °C (°F)	5.2 (41.4)	7.7 (45.9)	7.0 (44.6)	9.2 (48.6)	13.1 (55.6)	15.0 (59.0)	17.9 (64.2)	18.0 (64.4)	15.3 (59.5)	13.3 (55.9)	10.6 (51.1)	5.3 (41.5)	5.2 (41.4)
Average precipitation mm (inches)	47.2 (1.86)	40.3 (1.59)	39.8 (1.57)	53.8 (2.12)	116.3 (4.58)	232.9 (9.17)	157.7 (6.21)	215.9 (8.50)	171.4 (6.75)	175.5 (6.91)	56.6 (2.23)	51.8 (2.04)	1,359.2 (53.53)
Average rainy days	8	6	6	5	10	15	17	17	17	16	9	8	134
Average relative humidity (%)	78.0	78.0	76.0	74.0	77.0	79.0	77.0	79.0	81.0	80.0	78.0	78.0	77.9
Mean monthly sunshine hours	220.1	212.8	257.3	276.0	269.7	231.0	272.8	266.6	213.0	223.2	222.0	213.9	2,878.4
Mean daily sunshine hours	7.1	7.6	8.3	9.2	8.7	7.7	8.8	8.6	7.1	7.2	7.4	6.9	7.9
Source: NOAA

Average sea temperature
Jan	Feb	Mar	Apr	May	Jun	Jul	Aug	Sep	Oct	Nov	Dec
24 °C; 75 °F	24 °C; 75 °F	24 °C; 75 °F	25 °C; 77 °F	26 °C; 79 °F	28 °C; 82 °F	29 °C; 84 °F	29 °C; 84 °F	29 °C; 84 °F	28 °C; 82 °F	26 °C; 79 °F	25 °C; 77 °F

=== Urban development ===
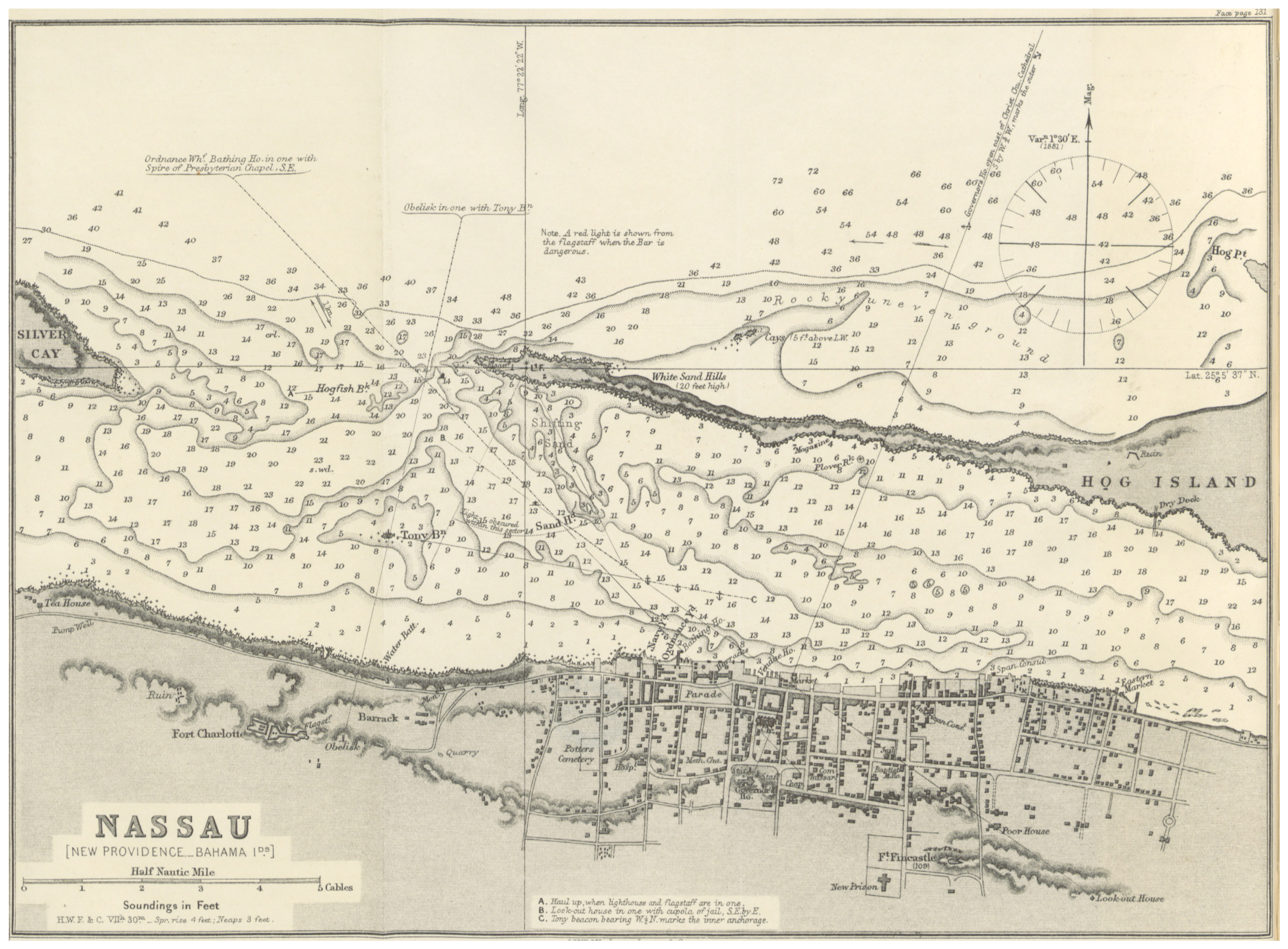
Nassau in the 1880s

During the 19th century, Nassau became urbanized, attracting rural residents. Growth since the 1950s has been outwards from the town. The 1788 heart of Nassau was just a few blocks of buildings between Government House and the harbour, but the town gradually expanded east to Malcolm's Park, south to Wulff Road, and west to Nassau Street. Grants Town and Bain Town south of the city became the main residential areas for those of African descent, and until about 30 years ago was the most populous part of the city.

Those of European descent built houses along the shore, east as far as Fort Montagu, west as far as Saunders Beach, and along the ridge edging the city. During the 20th century, the city spread east to Village Road and west to Fort Charlotte and Oakes Field. This semicircle of residential development was the main area of settlement until after the Second World War, and marks a distinct phase in the city's expansion, the outer boundary to this zone being the effective limit of the continuous built-up area. The wealthier residents continued to spread east (to East End Point) and West (to Lyford Cay).

In the last 40 years, residential development has been quite different. It has consisted mainly of planned middle-income sub-divisions. Since the 1960s, government has sponsored low-cost housing developments at Yellow Elder, Elizabeth Estates, and Pinewood Gardens, in the outer ring.

==== City centre ====
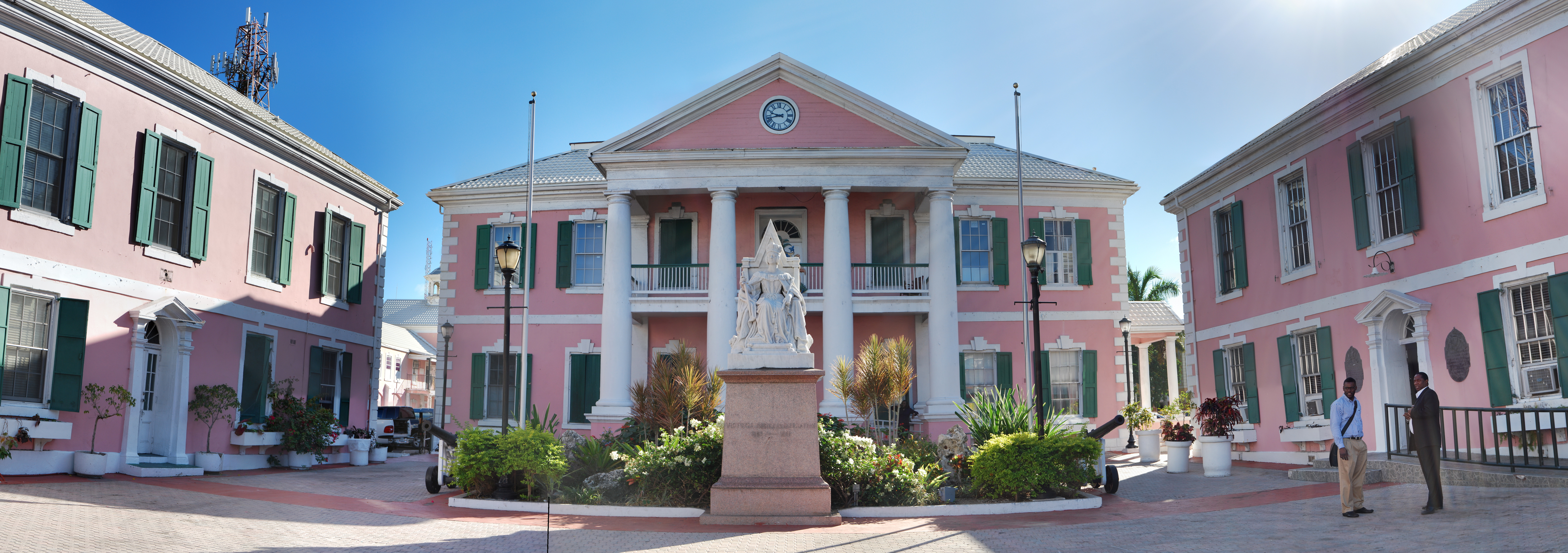
The Bahamian Parliament Building

Nassau's city centre serves as the principal centre of commercial, recreational and tourist activity. It receives thousands of visitors daily, emphasizing the city and the country's tourism sector through shopping, dining, and sightseeing. While the busiest part of central city is the Bay Street thoroughfare and the Woodes Rogers Walk, located across the street from the port and parallel to Bay, the area extends for several blocks in each direction. It starts at West Bay, around the Junkanoo Beach area. A few hotels and restaurants are located on West Bay.

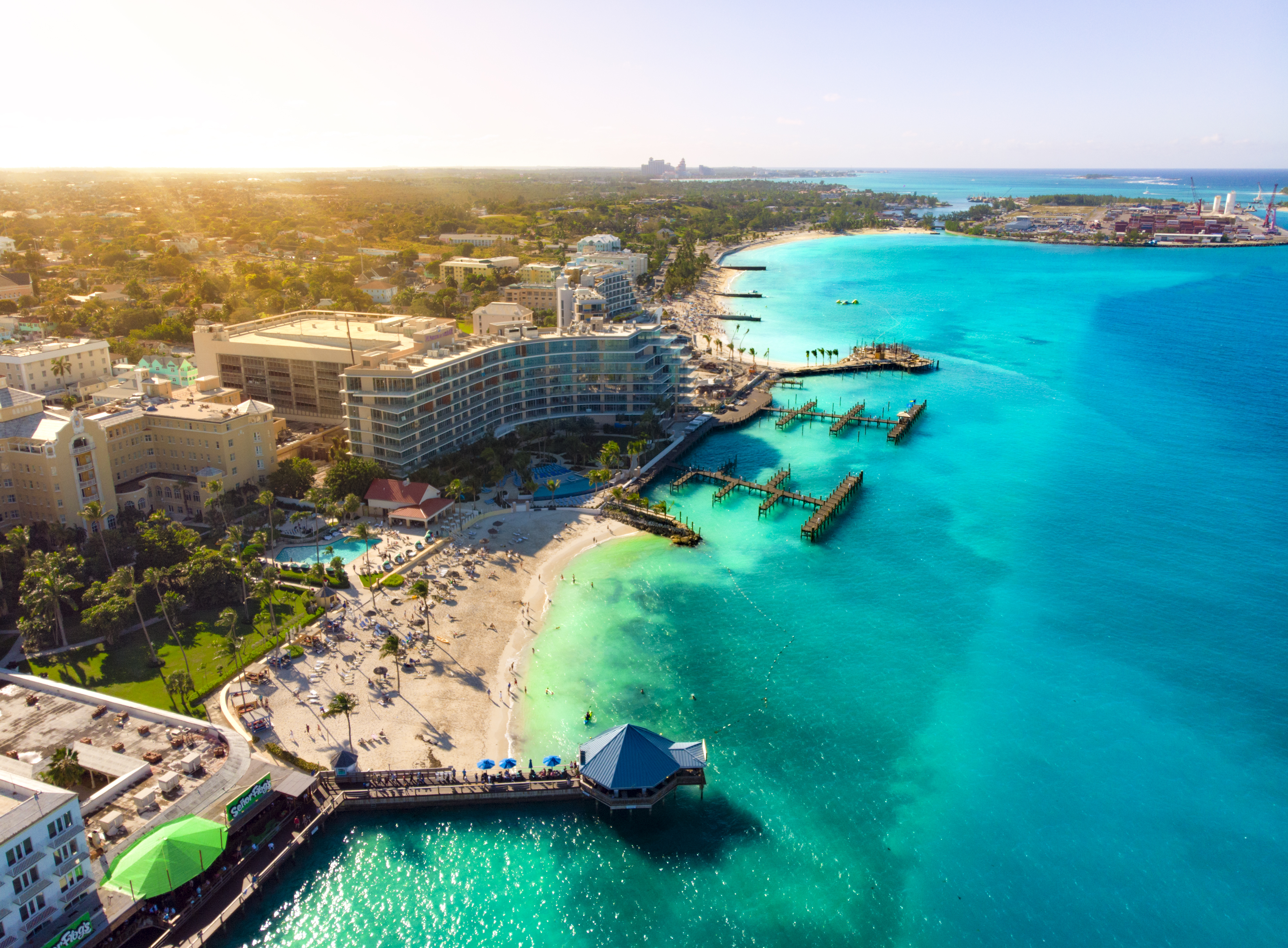
Aerial view of the British Colonial Hilton resort in Nassau

The next landmark is the British Colonial Hotel, which marks the beginning of Bay Street proper. Pirates of Nassau Museum is just across from the British Colonial Hilton. The next few blocks of Bay Street are wall-to-wall boutiques, with a few restaurants and clubs interspersed throughout the retailers. Historical landmarks are also in the vicinity, including Vendue House, Christ Church Cathedral, and the Nassau Public Library. Although the tourist part of the city centre peters out after about seven blocks, smaller, more local shops are located down Bay Street. At this point, Bay Street becomes East Bay.

The Straw Market is a tourist destination in the city centre. A new market was opened in 2011 after a fire in 2001 destroyed the original Fish, Vegetable and Straw Market. The market is open on all sides, and contains a number of Bahamian craft stores.

==== Cable Beach ====
Cable Beach is recognized as the hotel district of Nassau. Five hotels are located on this strip, two of which are all-inclusive.

The area is also known for its dining, with most of the area's restaurants in the hotels or across the street. There is a bit of shopping, most of it in the Wyndham and at Baha Mar. In 2017, the development of Baha Mar, a luxury resort and casino, brought more than 2,000 hotel rooms and the largest gaming and convention facility in the Caribbean to this section of New Providence Island.

== Demographics ==
Historical population
Year	Pop.	±%
1901	12,534	—
1931	19,756	+57.6%
1943	29,391	+48.8%
1953	46,125	+56.9%
1963	80,907	+75.4%
1970	102,005	+26.1%
1980	135,437	+32.8%
1990	172,196	+27.1%
2000	210,832	+22.4%
2010	246,329	+16.8%
2022	296,522	+20.4%

Nassau had a population of 128,420 females and 117,909 males and was home to 70,222 households with an average family size of 3.5 according to the 2010 census. Nassau's large population in relation to the remainder of the Bahamas is the result of waves of immigration from the Family Islands to the capital. Consequently, this has led to the decline in the population of the lesser developed islands and the rapid growth of Nassau.

=== Public safety ===
In January 2018, the U.S. Department of State issued the latest in a series of travel advisories due to violent crime.

== Transport ==
=== Air ===
Lynden Pindling International Airport (formerly Nassau International Airport) is on the western side of Nassau. New Providence Airport on Paradise Island was closed in 1999 with runway removed and integrated into the resort on the island.

=== Water ===
Ferries (boats) provide water travel around Nassau to the surrounding islands, namely Paradise Island.

Prince George Wharf is a seaport, the main port in the city, that serves cruise ships with ports of call in Nassau.

Transportation and shipping around the Family Islands is primarily through mailboats based at Potters Cay. International shipping is done through the Arawak Port Department on Arawak Cay. High speed excursions to Exuma, Spanish Wells and Harbour Island are available daily.

=== Roads ===
Public jitney buses and taxis provide transport in and around Nassau. Rental cars are also available in the city and at the airport.

Major roads in Nassau include:

- Bay Street
- West Hill Street
- Eastern Road
- Baillou Hill Road (Pronounced "Blue Hill Road" by locals)
- East Street
- Adelaide Road
- Shirley Street
- Soldier Road
- Carmicheal Road
- Prince Charles Drive
- John F Kennedy Drive
- Fox Hill Road
- Wulff Road
- Robinson Road

The major road in Nassau is Bay Street for tourists. Bay Street runs the entire length of the Island from East to West. Bay Street also provides beachfront views. The downtown area and the cruise ships are in walking distance.

The Bahamas is a left-hand traffic country, but many cars are imported from the US and are left-hand drive.

== Culture ==
=== UNESCO Creative Cities Network ===
Nassau has been recognized as a part of the UNESCO Creative Cities Network as a city of Crafts and Folk Art. It is one of only three Caribbean cities to receive this honour.

=== Junkanoo ===
Junkanoo participant in costume during the 2006 Parade

The city's chief festival is Junkanoo, an energetic, colourful street parade of brightly costumed people dancing to the rhythmic accompaniment of cowbells, drums and whistles. The word 'Junkanoo' is derived from the name of the founder: John Canoe. The celebration occurs on 26 December, 10 July and 1 January, beginning in the early hours of the morning (1:00 a.m.) and ending around 10 a.m. At the end of the Junkanoo procession, judges award cash prizes for the best music, costumes, and overall group presentation. Participants spend all year preparing their handmade costumes by using coloured crepe paper and cardboard.

== In popular culture ==
Nassau was the main setting for the Starz Network show Black Sails (2014–2017). However, filming was based in South Africa.

Nassau was featured as an important setting in several movies, including the Beatles film Help! and the James Bond films Thunderball (1965), Never Say Never Again (1983), and Casino Royale (2006). Nassau has also served as a shooting location for film production. In 1981, Nassau was used as a stand-in for Greece in an ocean scene in For Your Eyes Only.

Several other late-20th- and 21st-century movies have been set here, including After the Sunset (2004), Into the Blue (2005), and Flipper (1996).

It hosted the Miss Universe 2009 pageant.

Nassau was featured as a primary setting in the 2013 video game Assassin's Creed IV: Black Flag.

Nassau Town is mentioned in "Sloop John B", a Bahamian folk song. Since the early 1950s there have been many recordings of the song, the best known being by The Beach Boys on their Pet Sounds album.

Nassau is the subject of "Funky Nassau," a song written by Ray Munnings and Tyrone Fitzgerald and recorded by the Nassau-based funk band The Beginning of the End in 1971 as the single from their album of the same name. The song reached #7 on the US R&B chart, #15 on the Billboard Hot 100, and #31 on the UK Singles Chart in 1971.

== Twin towns – sister cities ==
Nassau's sister cities are:

- Nassau, Rhineland-Palatinate, Germany
- Detroit, Michigan, United States
- Winston-Salem, North Carolina, United States

== Infrastructure ==
Nassau is home to 6 hospitals or medical clinics:

- Doctors Hospital - private acute care facility located near Princess Margaret Hospital was founded in 1955 as Rassin Hospital
- Epcot Medical Center
- Lyford Cay Hospital
- Princess Margaret Hospital - primary acute care hospital in Nassau and the Bahamas. Opened in 1952 as Bahamas General Hospital
- Sandilands Psychiatric Hospital - Psychiatric facility
- Sandilands Rehabilitation Centre - facility specializing in mental, childhood and adolescent health, addiction, and geriatric services

Nassau is also home to the Nassau Container Port, which is located on Arawak Cay.

== Sports ==
Notable sporting events held by Nassau include:

- 2017 Commonwealth Youth Games
- 2018 World Judo Juniors Championships
- 2024 Caribbean Baseball Cup
- 2025 Caribbean Baseball Cup
- World Athletics Relays (2014, 2015, 2017, 2024, 2028)
- Bahamas Bowl (Annual Event)
- Bahamas Championship (Annual Event)

== Notable people ==
- Derrick Atkins (born 1984), World champ sprint Medalist specializing in the 100m
- Deandre Ayton (born 1998), NBA basketball player for the Washington Wizards. First overall pick in the 2018 NBA draft.
- Andretti Bain (born 1985), Olympic sprint Medalist specializing in the 400m
- Stanley Burnside (born 1947), cartoonist and painter
- Lakindes Brown (born 1987), beauty queen
- Chase Carter (born 1997), model
- Jazz Chisholm Jr. (born 1998), Major League Baseball Player for the New York Yankees
- Diane Claridge (born 1963), mammalogist
- Sean Connery (1930–2020), Scottish actor, best known for his role as James Bond in seven films
- Kyle Edmund (born 1995), British professional tennis player
- Maryke Hendrikse (born 1979), Canadian voice actress
- Nick Kyrgios (born 1995), Australian professional tennis player
- Kevin Ferguson aka "Kimbo Slice" (1974–2016), mixed martial artist, boxer, bare-knuckle boxer, professional wrestler
- Christopher Larson (born 1991), international footballer
- Nathaniel McKinney (born 1982), World champ relay sprint Medalist specializing in the 400m
- Ramon Miller (born 1987), Olympic sprint Medalist specializing in the 400m
- Shaunae Miller-Uibo (born 1994), Olympic sprint Medalist specializing in the 400m and 200m
- Hubert Minnis (born 1954), Politician
- Avard Moncur (born 1978), Olympic sprint Medalist specializing in the 400m
- Mike Oldfield (born 1953), English musician
- Justin Ospelt (born 1999), professional football goalkeeper
- Darron Pickstock, Lawyer and Senator
- Sidney Poitier (1927–2022), Bahamian-American actor, film director, author, and diplomat
- Antoan Richardson (born 1983), Major League Baseball outfielder and coach
- Denis Shapovalov (born 1999), Canadian tennis player
- Tonique Williams-Darling (born 1976), Olympic sprint Medalist specializing in the 400m
- Lexi Wilson (born 1991), model and beauty pageant titleholder
- Cheryl Bazard, ambassador and politician
- Rashad Sweeting, darts player, first ever Bahamian to play at the PDC World Darts Championship

== See also ==
- Ardastra Gardens, Zoo and Conservation Centre
- List of Caribbean Cities and Towns by population
- Nassau Public Library
