= List of University High School (Irvine, California) alumni =

The following is a list of notable alumni of University High School in Irvine, California. The list includes notable former pupils who attended the school.

== Sports ==
- Garrett Atkins - Class of 1997 - former Major League Baseball infielder for the Colorado Rockies and Baltimore Orioles
- Jeff Campbell - Class of 1981 - water polo silver medalist, 1988 Summer Olympics
- Peter Campbell - Class of 1978 - water polo silver medalist, 1984 Summer Olympics and 1988 Summer Olympics; four-time collegiate All-America
- Polly Plumer - Class of 1982 - track and field athlete, former national high school girls' record holder in the mile at 4:35.24, four-time collegiate All-America, track & field, UCLA Bruins
- Shar Pourdanesh - Class of 1988 - former NFL player (Redskins, Steelers, Raiders); first Iranian-born player
- Bojana Todorović - Class of 2009 - NCAA champion beach volleyball player in 2011 at UCLA, former professional volleyball player in France, Puerto Rico and the Philippines
- Tim Wallach - Class of 1975 - former Major League Baseball player and Los Angeles Dodgers hitting coach
- Amy White - Class of 1986 - silver medalist in the 100M backstroke, 1984 Summer Olympics

== Music ==
- Eddie Breckenridge - Class of 1998 - bass guitarist of hardcore punk band Thrice
- Riley Breckenridge - Class of 1993 - drummer of hardcore punk band Thrice
- Tim Commerford - Class of 1986 - bassist of rap metal band Rage Against the Machine, former bassist of Audioslave
- Zack de la Rocha - Class of 1988 - lead singer of rap metal band Rage Against the Machine
- Murphy Karges - Class of 1985 - bassist of alternative rock band Sugar Ray
- Martin Leung - Class of 2004 - video game pianist
- Vanness Wu - Class of 1996 - Taiwanese singer, actor, director and producer member of JVKV

== Film and theater ==
- Omid Abtahi - Class of 1997 - actor
- Justin Chon - Class of 1999 - actor
- David Engel - Class of 1977 - Broadway theatre/Off-Broadway singer and dancer best known for originating roles in the musicals Forever Plaid, La Cage aux Folles, and Seussical
- Will Ferrell - Class of 1986 - actor, comedian, and former Saturday Night Live cast member
- Robert MacNaughton - Class of 1984 - Hollywood actor best known for his role as Michael in the movie E.T. the Extra-Terrestrial
- Cady McClain - Class of 1987 - actress, The Young and the Restless; formerly "Dixie" on All My Children and "Rosanna" on As the World Turns
- Nicole Parker - Class of 1996 - MadTV cast member and comedian, Broadway actress
- Nasim Pedrad - Class of 1999 - Persian-American comedian and former Saturday Night Live cast member
- Eran Raven - Class of 1990 - aka Eran Feigenbaum, Master Mentalist on NBC's Phenomenon
- Gary Riley - Class of 1985 - Hollywood actor best known for his role as Charlie Hogan in the movie Stand by Me
- Sotaro Yasuda - Class of 2004 - Japanese American actor, played Ken Hisatsu / GekiChopper in the 2007 Super Sentai series, Juken Sentai Gekiranger

== Business ==
- Allen Adham - Class of 1984 - co-founder of Blizzard Entertainment
- Mike Cagney - co-founder and CEO of Figure Technology Solutions, co-founder and former CEO of SoFi
- Daniel Shemtob

== Journalism and academia ==
- David J. R. Frakt - Class of 1987 - law professor
- Shallon Lester - Class of 1999 - American gossip columnist and YouTuber
- Ezra Klein - Class of 2002 - Vox website founder and editor-in-chief; formerly Washington Post columnist and blogger, Newsweek columnist and MSNBC contributor
- Sudhir Alladi Venkatesh - Class of 1984 - sociologist and urban ethnographer

== Other ==
- Barbara Edwards - Class of 1978 - Playboy Playmate of the Year 1984
- Darius Rose - Class of 2003 - aka Jackie Cox, drag performer and fourth place finisher on RuPaul's Drag Race
- Dita Von Teese - Class of 1990 - aka Heather Sweet, burlesque star and fashion model, divorced from Marilyn Manson
- Yoo Yoonjin - Class of 2010 - aka Jinnytty, Twitch streamer and YouTuber
