= Ron Suber =

American investor

- Born: c. 1964 (age 60–61); United States
- Education: BA in economics
- Alma mater: University of California, Berkeley
- Occupation(s): Business executive, investor
- Title: President emeritus of Prosper Marketplace
- Board member of: Credible

Ron Suber is an American investor and business executive. He has held executive positions at Bear Stearns, Spectrum Global, Merlin Securities, Wells Fargo Securities, and Prosper Marketplace. He is also an investor in sixteen financial technology companies.

== Education ==
Ron Suber holds a BA in economics from the University of California, Berkeley.

== Career ==
Suber began working at Bear Stearns in 1992. In 2006 Suber then joined Spectrum Global as president; the fund held $24 billion under management at that time. In 2008, Suber began working at Merlin Securities in 2008, where he was head of global sales. In 2012 he then moved to Wells Fargo, where he served as managing director of Wells Fargo Securities following Wells Fargo's acquisition of Merlin.

Suber served as the president of Prosper Marketplace, until taking the position of president emeritus. He first joined the company in 2013 as an investor. At Prosper, he provided an online lending platform for company founders looking for investment. In this role he has been referred to as a "fintech pioneer". As an investor focusing on Fintech, Suber has invested in companies including DocuSign and SoFi, and held investments in sixteen firms as of 2017. Suber is also on the board of and vice chairman of the Australian Securities Exchange listed firm, Credible, and the advisory boards of DocuSign, Juvo, Unison Home Ownership Investors, Money360, and eOriginal.

He has also served as a financial commentator for CNBC, and has spoken at events including the LendIt Conference.

In October 2019, Suber joined the board of fintec startup Qwil and in September 2020, he joined the board of directors of Yieldstreet.
