= Home Ownership Investment =

A home ownership investment is used by home purchasers to raise funds to buy real estate or by home owners to extract cash from a real estate investment. In exchange for cash, the home owner shares in some percentage of the increase and sometimes also the decrease in value of the real estate property. When the home is sold, the home owner settles by returning to the investor some amount of the proceeds from the sale based on the change in value of the real estate asset. Alternatively, the contract may have a maturity period or may provide the homeowner the option to terminate the contract at their discretion. In this case, an appraisal may be necessary to deem the price change of the asset and therefore the return to the investor.

A home ownership investment is an alternative to a mortgage. Unlike a mortgage, home ownership investments typically do not require any interest or principal payments throughout the life of the contract which can be up to 30 years. A home ownership investment is comparable to an equity investment in a company wherein the investor only acquires exposure to the change in value of the underlying asset allowing the seller of equity to raise funds by decreasing their risk exposure to the asset rather than increasing leverage.

== Details ==
In a typical home ownership investment, a homeowner will receive 10% of the purchase value of the home in cash from an investor. In exchange, when the contract terminates, the investor will receive some percentage share in the increase or decrease of the value of the home, often between 35 and 50%, in addition to the initial investment.

A home ownership investment can be originated at the time of purchase or on a currently owned home. If the investment in originated at the time of purchase, the purchase price is taken as a reference price for future return calculations. If the home is currently owned, an appraisal may be necessary to determine the original agreed upon price of the asset at origination.

There are three ways in which the contract can terminate. If a sale occurs, the return to the investor is calculated based on the difference between the final sale price and the original agreed upon price multiplied by the percentage share. Alternatively, the contract may expire before a sale occurs. In this case an appraisal may need necessary to determine the final price of the home. Finally, a typical contract will provide the homeowner the option to terminate the contract before maturity at which point an appraisal may again be performed to determine the return of the home owed to the investor.

== See also ==
- Unison Home Ownership Investors
- Affordable housing
- Subsidized housing
