= Legality of ridesharing companies by jurisdiction =

The legality of ridesharing companies by jurisdiction varies; in some areas they are considered to be illegal taxi operations, while in other areas, they are subject to regulations that can include requirements for driver background checks, fares, caps on the number of drivers in an area, insurance, licensing, and minimum wage.

== Legality by country ==
=== Australia ===
==== Requirement of drivers to pay GST ====
In May 2015, the Australian Taxation Office (ATO) issued a directive stating that drivers that generate income via a ridesharing company need to have an Australian Business Number and be registered to pay the Goods and Services Tax (GST). Uber filed suit in the Federal Court of Australia, arguing that the public issue by the ATO "unfairly targets Uber's driver-partners". In February 2017, a justice found in favor of the ATO, requiring drivers to register, collect and pay GST. The ATO ruling overrides the standard applied to other small Australian businesses, which only requires businesses grossing more than A$75,000 to collect and remit GST.

==== Australian Capital Territory ====
Ridesharing was legalized in the Australian Capital Territory in September 2015. At the same time, fees for taxis and hire cars were reduced to enable them to compete against rideshare operators. Taxis will continue to have the exclusive right to work at taxi ranks or be hailed.

==== New South Wales ====
On 30 April 2014, Transport for New South Wales clarified that ridesharing company services must be provided in a licensed taxi or hire car, by an appropriately accredited driver. In December 2014, the New South Wales government confirmed that in April 2014, it conducted an unannounced search of Uber's Sydney offices in April.

In August 2015, the New South Wales government created a task force to look into regulating Uber. From 17 December 2015, taxi and ridesharing passengers pay a $1 levy per trip for five years to fund a $250 million compensation fund for taxi licence holders.

==== Northern Territory ====
Ridesharing was legalized in the Northern Territory in January 2018, with a $1 levy being imposed on all taxi, minibus, private hire and ridesharing trips.

==== Queensland ====
In mid-November 2014, the Taxi Council of Queensland (TCQ) launched an anti-Uber media campaign. Uber defended itself against the claims.

Effective 5 September 2016, Uber was legalized in Queensland.

==== South Australia ====
Ridesharing was legalised in South Australia on 1 July 2016, following a review that commenced in January 2015. As part of the reform package, compensation was offered for those in the taxi industry, and a $1 metropolitan ride levy was introduced to fund the compensation. Taxis will continue to have the exclusive right to work at ranks or be hailed.

==== Tasmania ====
Ridesharing companies were legalized in Tasmania in December 2016.

==== Victoria ====
On 6 May 2014, the Victorian Taxi Service Commission fined Uber drivers A$1,723. State officers said that they will review the state's Transport Act, while Uber said it will reimburse its drivers.

On 4 December 2015, an Uber driver was found guilty of driving a hire car without a licence or registration. The case was the first of 12 brought against Uber drivers. On 18 May 2016, the judgement was overturned on appeal, effectively legalizing Uber in Victoria.

On 25 August 2016, the government announced plans to legalize ridesharing in Victoria. From 2018, taxi licences were abolished and licence holders compensated by an 8-year A$1 levy on all taxi and ride-booking services in the state.

==== Western Australia ====
From 18 December 2015, new regulations were introduced, including a requirement that ridesharing company apply for omnibus licences, as required by taxi services. Both Uber and the taxi industry supported the regulations, which provided certainty.

=== Bangladesh ===
Uber was launched on November 22, 2016 in Dhaka, but within 36 hours of its launching, Bangladesh Road Transport Authority (BRTA) declared it illegal. Uber and other ridesharing companies lobbied the government to legalize ridesharing companies. Though the government ban was still on effect, the ridesharing companies operated in the city. On December 3, 2017, the BRTA formulated a guideline for ridesharing companies and most of the ridesharing companies were given operating licenses by February 2018.

The CNG auto-rickshaw drivers of Dhaka and Chittagong implemented a strike action on December 27–28, 2017 with 8 demands that included a ban on ridesharing companies. They faced a huge backlash from general public as the CNG auto-rickshaw drivers are notoriously known for overcharging passengers, breaking traffic rules, and misconduct with passengers. In early 2018, a large faction CNG auto-rickshaw drivers decided to join Uber and the ridesharing companies, which operate auto-rickshaw service.

=== Belgium ===
In April 2014, Uber was banned in Brussels, and the company was threatened with fines of €10,000 if it offers fares to drivers who are not in possession of a taxi license. Bruxelles-Mobilite, the city's federal region administration responsible for infrastructure and traffic, impounded 13 cars aligned with Uber after March 2014 and a spokesperson for the body described the service as "illegal" in June 2014. The spokesperson also said in a public statement that Bruxelles-Mobilite was generally addressing the issue of illegal taxi drivers in a sector that was difficult to regulate. Although already banned in Brussels, Uber advertised for a Brussels-based "General Manager" on the LinkedIn website in June 2014. The advertisement stated that the role was "by far the most demanding position Uber has to offer."

In October 2015, Uber suspended its UberPOP service, but continued to operate its UberX service, which uses licensed drivers.

In March 2018, taxi drivers protested, blocking roads, demanding the government drop plans to make it easier for ridesharing companies to operate.

=== Brazil ===
On April 29, 2015, a Brazilian court banned Uber in response to complaints by a taxi drivers' union. The court also ordered Apple Inc., Google Inc., Microsoft, and Samsung Electronics to prevent installation and use of the Uber mobile app by Brazilian residents. A few weeks later, the order was revoked, allowing Uber to operate normally.

On July 24, 2015, 1,000 taxi drivers in Rio de Janeiro blocked traffic during the morning rush hour. Lawmakers voted to ban Uber in São Paulo and Brasília.

In October 2015, Fernando Haddad, the mayor of São Paulo, signed a bill to allow for a new category of "black taxis" which would operate in parallel to the city's existing licensed taxis but only be bookable via mobile phone apps. Uber rejected the proposal.

In late 2015, an Uber driver was beaten by taxi drivers in Brazil, and similar attacks followed.

=== Bulgaria ===
Uber began operations in Sofia in December 2014. In September 2015, a court upheld fines imposed on Uber for unfair trade practices and Uber subsequently stopped service in Bulgaria.

=== Canada ===
Uber drivers in Canada are required "to register, collect and remit HST/GST from their fares to the government", regardless of their income.

==== Toronto ====
On December 5, 2012, Toronto officials charged Uber with 25 municipal licensing infractions, including operation of an unlicensed taxi brokerage and unlicensed limousine service. Municipal officials said they had advised the company to comply with local regulations and that rival taxi dispatch apps had obtained licenses. Despite support from some quarters including mayor John Tory, Toronto Police Service launched a crackdown on Uber drivers. In July 2015, a $400M class-action lawsuit was filed against UberX and UberXL in Toronto on behalf of Ontario taxi and limo drivers, brokers, and owners, who alleged that Uber violated section 39.1 of the province's Highway Traffic Act by having unlicensed drivers picking up passengers and transporting them for compensation. In March 2016, Sukhvir Tehethi, a local taxi driver, filed an injunction against Uber to stop it from operating. A Toronto city councillor warned that passengers using UberX may be fined up to $20,000. On March 3, 2016, after hours of heated debate, the City Council of Toronto passed a bylaw allowing UberX to operate legally in the city with conditions, while also cutting regulations for taxis.

==== Edmonton ====
Edmonton officials unveiled a proposed ridesharing bylaw on September 9, 2015 to permit Uber to operate legally in Edmonton. Uber opposed the accompanying regulations. Uber was legalized in Edmonton on Wednesday, January 27, 2016 effective as of March 1, 2016. However, Uber ceased operations in Edmonton on March 1, 2016, citing inability to obtain the necessary insurance. Uber continued to operate outside of Edmonton despite lack of insurance or proper licensing of their drivers. Uber pulled their cars off Edmonton streets until July 1 when the province approved an insurance policy specifically for ride-sharing companies.

==== Calgary ====
In 2015, Calgary, Alberta charged at least 17 drivers illegally driving for Uber without insurance. Uber was given clearance to operate in Calgary in December 2016.

==== Surrey ====
In 2020, mayor Doug McCallum gained criticism in the media when he refused to allow Uber drivers to operate in the city of Surrey, despite municipalities not having the power to block ridesharing under provincial law in British Columbia. McCallum stated that the ban on Uber drivers was enacted to protect the jobs of taxi drivers working in Surrey. As part of the ban, any Uber driver caught driving a passenger within city limits would have to pay a $500 fine. After losing a legal battle with Uber, a Supreme Court of British Columbia judge ordered the city to stop issuing the fines, allowing Uber and other provincially-regulated ridesharing companies to freely operate within its jurisdiction.

==== Quebec ====
Uber continues to negotiate with the government of Quebec after the government issued regulations requiring drivers to undergo 35 hours of training and a background check.

As of January 2019, in the same pilot project as Uber, the Government of Quebec authorizes Eva, a local cooperative alternative, to run in Montreal, Quebec and Gatineau. Eva launches the application in May 2019, becoming the second most used application in Quebec.

==== Halifax ====
Following a bylaw change November 1, 2020, ridesharing companies were officially allowed to begin operating in Halifax, Nova Scotia. Uber launched in the city on December 3, 2020.

==== New Brunswick ====
In November, 2020, the province of New Brunswick passed legislation that give ridesharing companies the right to operate, asking local municipalities to regulate their use.

=== Costa Rica ===
On August 21, 2015, Uber started operations in Costa Rica and multiple Uber drivers were immediately attacked by taxi drivers.

=== China ===
In December 2014, in Chongqing, police raided a training session organised by Uber that was attended by more than 20 drivers. In April 2015, Chinese authorities raided the offices of Uber in Guangzhou, Guangdong.

On May 6, 2015, local police raided Uber's offices in Chengdu, in Sichuan province.

In 2016, Uber sold its Chinese operations to Didi.

=== Croatia ===
Before Uber began operations in Croatia, the Sustainable Development of Croatia party and major taxi service companies were against it, stating that the price of Uber service doesn't compensate the drivers enough for gas, car maintenance, passenger insurance, nor health and retirement insurance for the driver, and Uber prices also don't include VAT nor surtax. In October 2015, Uber initiated service in Zagreb. In June 2016, the Uber started operating in Split, Croatia and Dubrovnik. In September 2016, a group of taxi drivers attacked an Uber driver who was waiting for a passenger at Zagreb Airport. The Uber driver canceled the ride before the passenger arrived and drove away, with the attackers following him. The attack was filmed by the victim and reported to the Law enforcement in Croatia.

=== Czech Republic ===
The biggest protests against Uber in Prague took place in February 2018, when the taxi drivers drove forth and back along the highway. This was repeated for several days. Roads in Prague was also occupied by taxi drivers in October 2017 when they protested near the airport. Uber's activity in Brno was preliminarily stopped by the regional court in July 2017, but in October 2017, a higher court canceled the measure. In March 2018, Uber concluded an agreement with the Czech government. Drivers under this agreement will have to be licensed as taxi drivers.

=== Denmark ===
After Uber Black and UberPop were launched in Copenhagen in November 2014, the Danish Transport Authority filed a complaint accusing Uber of operating illegally. In January 2015, Denmark's transport minister stated that, although he was not opposed to Uber, the app was "contrary" to Danish law—consumer safety and employee training were identified as the key concerns.

In July 2016, six Uber drivers were convicted for offering taxi services without license. Police also charged more than 48 Uber drivers for unlicensed taxi driving.

On November 18, 2016, the Østre Landsret ruled that Uber is an illegal taxi service.

Uber shut operations in Denmark in April 2017.

=== Egypt ===
After several protests, sit-ins, and violent attacks by taxi operators in 2016 and a lawsuit filed in March 2018, the Egyptian government legalized Uber and Careem in May 2018. The regulations require the ridesharing companies to pay license fees and share user data with the government.

=== European Union ===
On June 11, 2014, in a concerted action, taxis blocked roads in major European cities in protest against what they perceived as a threat to their livelihoods from ridesharing companies. The cabbies contended that Uber and similar smartphone app-based services have an unfair advantage because they are not subject to the same kinds of fees and regulations placed on taxis.

In December 2017, the European Court of Justice ruled that Uber is a transport company, subject to local transport regulation in European Union member states, rather than an information society service as Uber had argued.

=== Finland ===
Uber launched UberPop in Helsinki in 2014. In September 2016, the Helsinki Court of Appeal deemed Uber illegal, as the company did not have a taxi license. Drivers faced criminal prosecution.

In 2018, Uber was legalized in Finland.

=== France ===
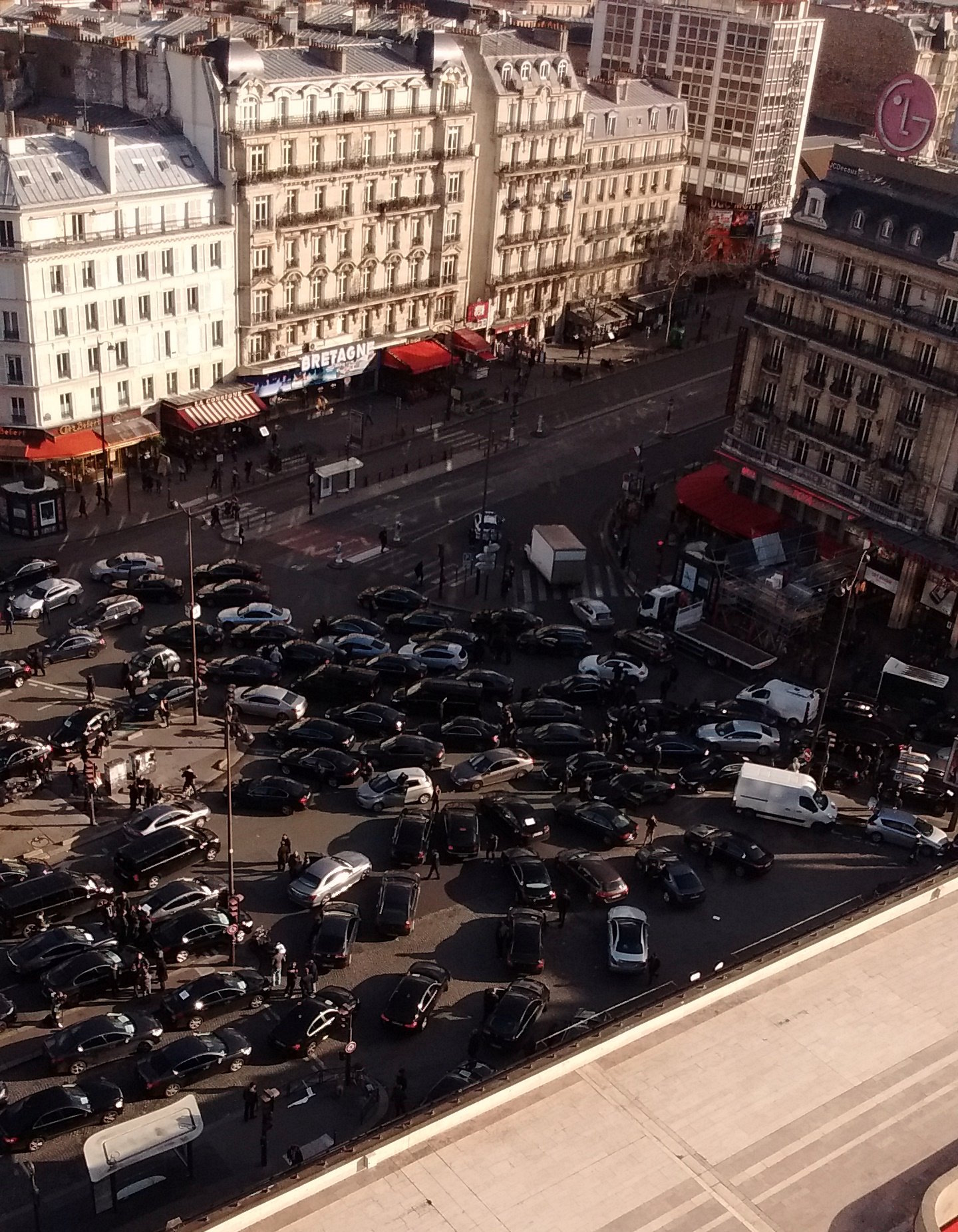
Uber drivers on strike at Montparnasse, Paris, February 3, 2016

On January 13, 2014, cab drivers in Paris attacked an Uber driver's car near Charles de Gaulle Airport, protesting competition.

On October 17, 2014, a court ruled that Uber was illegal and stated that UberPop violated a pre-existent regulation that bans carpooling for profit and fined Uber €100,000.

On December 12, 2014, a French court ruled that Uber could not advertise some of its services to the general public in France; if it did so, it would face a $25,000 daily fine.

Effective January 1, 2015, UberPop was banned under the provisions of the Thévenoud Law, which requires anyone carrying passengers for hire to be licensed and have insurance.

By February 23, 2015 about 100 drivers, mostly first-time offenders, had been ticketed.

UberPool remained operational in Paris and continued to aggressively recruit French drivers and passengers.

On June 25, 2015, cab drivers in Paris "locked down" Paris in an anti-Uber protest that became increasingly violent. Musician Courtney Love got caught in the protest and live tweeted as her Uber cab was violently attacked and she and her driver were held hostage.

In June 2015, French authorities arrested two Uber managers on six charges, including "deceptive commercial practices", complicity in instigating an illegal taxi-driving activity, and the illegal stocking of personal information.

On July 5, 2015, Uber suspended UberPop in the face of pressure by the French government while awaiting a court decision.

On September 22, 2015, France's highest constitutional authority rejected Uber's appeal of a law banning UberPop.

In June 2016, a Paris court fined Uber €800,000, half suspended, for illegally running its UberPop service in 2015.

=== Germany ===
In early 2014, Berlin authorities ruled against Uber—which operated in the German cities of Berlin, Munich, Frankfurt, Hamburg, and Düsseldorf—on two occasions following a case filed by the Berlin Taxi Association. The first ruling, delivered by a court in April 2014, deemed Uber's limousine service to be in breach of local legislation, while an August 13, 2014 decision banned the service from operating in Berlin due to safety concerns—the latter decision, which included a €25,000 fine for non-compliance, cited issues pertaining to unregulated vehicles and unqualified drivers who are not properly insured.

On August 28, 2014, a court in Frankfurt issued an immediate cease and desist order against Uber following an appeal from Taxi Deutschland. The preliminary injunction applied to all of Germany and included a fine of €250,000 per ride for non-compliance. If the injunction was breached, Uber's German-based employees could be jailed for up to 6 months and the company could be fined. UberBLACK was not affected by the ruling.

On September 16, 2014, the district court of Frankfurt revoked the preliminary injunction, thereby re-allowing Uber to operate in Germany. The presiding judge wrote that the Taxi Deutschland case "would have had prospects for success", but the case was merely lodged too late, as any case needs to be filed within two months of a service's launch—Uber started in Germany in April 2014, but the case was filed in August 2014. Taxi Deutschland appealed the ruling.

On March 18, 2015, a Frankfurt district court imposed a nationwide ban on UberPop, claiming that drivers do not have proper licensing and insurance. Each violation of this order would be subject to a €250,000 fine.

In October 2015, Uber limited its operations to its UberX and UberBLACK services, which requires drivers that hold passenger transport licenses.

In November 2018, Uber began operations in Düsseldorf, working with licensed drivers and taxi companies.

=== Greece ===
In April 2018, Uber suspended service in Greece after regulations were implemented that require all rides to begin and end in the fleet partner's designated headquarters or parking area.

=== Hong Kong ===
On August 11, 2015, Hong Kong Police raided Uber's office after arresting five drivers in a sting operation aimed at combating Illegal taxi operations. Two more drivers were arrested on the next day. However, the Hong Kong government investment agency, InvestHK, had endorsed Uber as one of its "success stories" on its website, although the endorsement was later removed.

On March 15, 2018, a group of local taxi drivers protested outside the Hong Kong Police Headquarters, requesting for actions to be taken on those "unlicensed taxis". They accused Uber from using false and misleading documents to lie to the public. On the same day, another group of taxi drivers protested by honking their horns for 30 seconds in Admiralty, Hong Kong at noon. They also threatened to flood the area with their vehicles if no actions are taken by the government.

=== Hungary ===
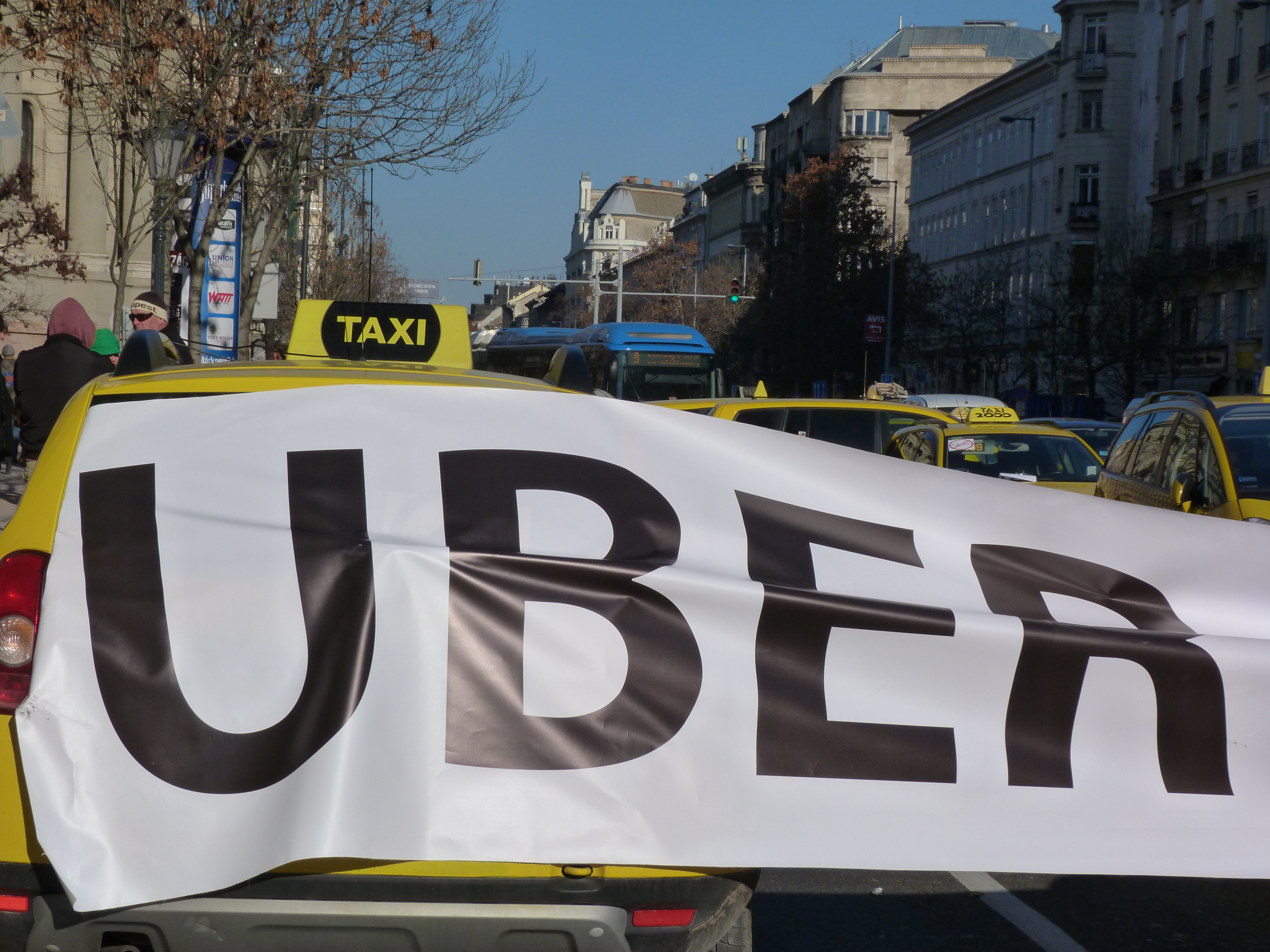
A protest against Uber by taxi drivers

In July 2016, Uber was ruled to be an illegal taxi service in Hungary and subsequently suspended operations. Bolt however operates in Hungary.

=== India ===
==== Hyderabad ====
The Hyderabad road transport authority banned Uber cabs a day after the Indian Ministry of Home Affairs advised all states to stop the operation of ridesharing companies. A spokesman for the authority said that Uber did not hold a license to operate in the city, and asked the public to cease using Uber.

==== Karnataka ====
After Home Minister Rajnath Singh announced in Parliament on December 9, 2014 that he had advised all states and Union territories to ban unregistered and unlicensed cab services, the state government of Karnataka banned Uber on December 11, 2014.

==== New Delhi ====
In December 2014, following allegations of rape against an Uber driver in New Delhi, Uber was banned from New Delhi for not following the city's compulsory police verification procedure. The driver had been charged, then acquitted, of a prior sexual assault in 2011. Within two days of the rape incident, almost 7,000 people signed a petition calling on Uber to conduct mandatory 7-year background checks on drivers, in line with its U.S. operations. Delhi's transport department banned Uber. Uber issued a statement stating that it would work with the Indian government "to establish clear background checks currently absent in their commercial transportation licensing programs."

In banning Uber, Delhi's transport department cited several rules that Uber had broken. According to New Delhi's Radio Taxi Scheme, 2006, all taxi licensees must be either a company under the Companies Act, 2013 (or the 1956 Act), or a society under the Societies Registration Act, 1860. Furthermore, taxi services must provide adequate parking space for all taxis, as well as sufficiently sized office space to accommodate the control room, the maintenance of a minimum fleet size per license (500 vehicles), and all vehicles must be fitted with GPS/GPRS tracking systems (to be in constant communication with the control room while on duty). The rules also stipulate that the taxi licensee is responsible for ensuring the quality of drivers, including police verifications, supervision, and employee behaviour.

Uber is faced with limits to the number of drivers that are allowed to operate. but now its operating in New Delhi.

=== Indonesia ===
On March 22, 2016, thousands of taxi drivers in Jakarta demonstrated against Uber and a similar service, Grab. Several places were targeted during the protests, including the Istana Merdeka, the DPR/MPR Building, and the Ministry of Communication and Informatics central office. Taxi drivers accused that Grab and Uber were causing them to receive smaller daily incomes due to the rising number of app users. The demonstrators also demanded that the government ban the apps and issue a governmental decree concerning this problem.

In January 2019, Indonesia announced plans to fix the rates charged by ridesharing companies such as Grab and Go-Jek.

=== Israel ===
Uber first introduced a limited service in the Tel Aviv area in August 2014. However, in November 2017 the Tel Aviv District Court issued a permanent injunction against Uber's utilizing private cars in Israel on the grounds that these lacked the insurance coverage of regulated taxis. Uber was allowed to provide its service in licensed taxis as do other crowd-sourced ride-hailing companies such as Gett. Although Uber had the support of Prime Minister Benjamin Netanyahu, the court ruled for the taxi companies and drivers who opposed Uber.

=== Italy ===
On May 25, 2015, Italian judge dott. Claudio Marangoni banned the UberPop app for unfair competition practices.

In February 2017, Italian taxi drivers implemented a strike action.

On April 6, 2017, Italian judge dott. Alfredo Landi banned the UberBlack, Uber-Lux, Uber-SUV, Uber-X, Uber-XL, UberSelect and Uber-Van app throughout Italy for unfair competition practices.

In November 2017, Italian taxi drivers implemented another nationwide strike action.

In May 2022, Uber, in partnership with IT Taxi, the largest taxi dispatcher in Italy, integrated Italian taxis into its mobile app.

=== Japan ===
As of 2025, Western-style ridesharing services remain illegal in Japan. Companies like Uber do operate in Japan, but their services are limited to dispatching taxis from existing Japanese taxi companies. In other words, the typical ridesharing model, where private individuals use their own vehicles for profit, is not offered.

To legally operate a paid passenger transportation business in Japan, vehicles must be registered for commercial use, and drivers are required to hold a Class 2 Driver's License (第2種運転免許, Dai-Ni-Shu Unten Menkyo), as stipulated by the Road Transportation Act. As a result, ridesharing services based on the premise of using private vehicles driven by ordinary drivers without a Class 2 Driver's License are illegal.

However, due to declining populations and an aging society, a limited pilot program was launched in 2016 in Kyōtango City, Kyoto Prefecture, under the name Sasaeai Kōtsū (ささえ合い交通, lit. "Mutual Support Transport"), targeting "special zones" in depopulated rural areas. Similar experimental services have since been implemented in a few other regions. These trials operate under the provision of "paid transport in areas without public transit (公共交通空白地有償運送, kōkyō kōtsū kūhakuchi yūshō unsō)," as defined in Article 78, Item 2 of the Road Transportation Act. Management is handled by local governments or nonprofit organizations. Local residents serve as drivers, with mandatory training programs, and operations are limited to non-commercial purposes. Fares are generally set at around half the upper limit of taxi fares.

On March 13, 2024, the Ministry of Land, Infrastructure, Transport and Tourism (MLIT) announced a new system called the “Japanese-style ridesharing (日本版ライドシェア, Nihon-ban raidoshea)” as a measure to address the shortage of taxi vehicles. This system allows paid transportation services using private vehicles and general drivers under the supervision of taxi companies. From April, operations were authorized in specific areas of Tokyo, Kanagawa, Aichi, and Kyoto Prefectures.

Furthermore, on April 26, 2024, the government issued a directive allowing "public ridesharing (公共ライドシェア, kōkyō raidoshea)" services, which enable joint operation between taxi companies and local governments or nonprofit organizations. This new framework allows municipalities to lead and operate paid transport services utilizing local private vehicles and general drivers in conjunction with taxi services.

Meanwhile, discussions continue over the potential legalization of ridesharing services based on the Western model, in which platform providers take the lead. However, opinions are divided: Taro Kono, the Minister of State for Regulatory Reform, supports full deregulation, while Tetsuo Saito, the Minister of Land, Infrastructure, Transport and Tourism, takes a more cautious stance. Due to this divide, the government has decided to postpone the policy direction that was originally scheduled to be announced around June 2024.

=== Malaysia ===
On October 15, 2014, five Uber drivers were involved in a crackdown by the Road Transport Department (JPJ), under the Ops Teksi Uber 2014 operation—which began on October 1. The 4 other vehicles were returned to their respective owners—with their documents confiscated pending further investigation by the Land Public Transport Commission (SPAD). Due to a wide range of circumstances, the 4 vehicles could be returned to owners should proper documents and other factors correlate. On October 17, 2014, JPJ continued its crackdown on drivers. Between October 2014 and October 2015, the Land Public Transport Commission impounded 44 Uber vehicles, using many methods such as tracking the vehicles using Uber's app. It was also reported that some taxi drivers have taken it upon themselves to nab Uber drivers and turn them over to the police.

In July 2017, legislation was passed to legalize Uber.

=== Morocco ===
Uber began services in Casablanca in July 2015 but suspended service in Morocco in February 2018 after it was not clear that the service was legal.

=== Netherlands ===
On December 8, 2014, Dutch judges banned UberPop and implemented a €100,000 fine and the €40,000 fine for drivers who are apprehended. At first Uber continued operating, but Uber shut down its service in November 2015 after office raids by Dutch authorities.

=== New Zealand ===
In January 2015, several Uber vehicles were stopped by New Zealand police, claiming that Uber was in violation of the Land Transport Act. Two Uber drivers were charged with violating the Land Transport Act and face fines of up to NZ$10,000.

On January 20, 2015, the Associate Transport Minister, Craig Foss, said that the rules covering taxis and private hire services, including Uber, will be reviewed by New Zealand officials by mid-2015.

In April and May 2016 the New Zealand Transport Authority (NZTA) sent warnings to 17 Uber drivers who did not comply with current regulations.

On August 3, 2017, Uber New Zealand GM, Richard Menzies, announced that Uber is formally recognized as part of the public transport mix, meaning it can legally operate in New Zealand. Uber Eats was later launched in New Zealand that year.

On October 25, 2022, New Zealand Employment Court Chief Judge Christina Inglis ruled that New Zealand-based Uber drivers operating in New Zealand were employees rather than contractors, entitling them to various workers' rights and protections under New Zealand law. Inglis ruled in favor of four Uber drivers, who had challenged Uber's position that the drivers were independent contractors. In response, Uber criticised the Employment Court's ruling and announced that they would appeal the judgment.

On August 26, 2023, the Court of Appeal of New Zealand upheld the Employment Court's 2022 ruling that Uber drivers should be treated as employees rather than contractors. Uber Australia and New Zealand managing director Emma Foley said that the company would appeal the decision.

=== Norway ===
Uber began operations in Norway in 2014.

According to the Norwegian Professional Transport Act, a taxi license is required to charge for passenger transport "addressed to general public on public space" In 2015, an Uber driver was acquitted because the court found that communication through a mobile app was not to be regarded as "public space."

On October 30, 2017, Uber suspended its UberPOP service in Oslo, continuing to operate UberBLACK and UberXL service.

=== Philippines ===
On October 23, 2014, despite the recommendation of the Metropolitan Manila Development Authority, the Philippine Land Transportation Franchising and Regulatory Board (LTFRB) imposed a ₱120,000 (US$2,676) to ₱200,000 (US$4,460) fine for the use of the Uber app. A spokesperson for the board said that the fines were issued because Uber did not have an approved franchise to operate in the country. The LTFRB also remarked that Uber can still operate in Metro Manila if the House of Representatives of the Philippines grants the company a proper legislative franchise.

On October 30, 2014, after an intervention from the Department of Transportation and Communications, the LTFRB temporarily suspended its campaign of apprehending Uber vehicles.

Amid opposition from taxi companies, On May 10, 2015, ridesharing companies gained legal ground to operate. The country requires a GPS system installed, a young fleet of vehicles, and the appropriate permits. Taxis were also given a chance to compete by also giving them a sub-classification that matches features found in Uber and other similar services. On August 19, 2015, Uber complied and secured government registration to become the country's second ridesharing company after Grab. Individual vehicle operators however still need to undergo separate registrations with the LTFRB.

Uber suspended service for a month on August 14, 2017 due to the defiance of LTFRB's order on not to accredit drivers in their systems starting July 26, 2017.

In August 2018, the Philippines set additional regulations for ridesharing companies including fare transparency, acceptance rates for bookings and faster response time to complaints, with fines for non-compliance. At that time, Grab had a 93% market share.

=== Poland ===
Following the commencement of Uber services in Warsaw in 2014, Jarosław Iglikowski, chief of the Union of Warsaw Taxi Drivers, said: "We will put pressure on politicians, and demand that they change the regulations [for firms offering taxi services]."

In June 2017, after a protest by 2,000 taxi drivers, Deputy Prime Minister Mateusz Morawiecki announced that Poland may impose more regulations on Uber.

In April 2018, Poland announced new licensing requirements for ridesharing companies such as Uber and Taxify.

=== Portugal ===
On April 29, 2016, a protest including 2,000 taxi drivers took place in major cities in Portugal.

In October 2016, thousands of Portuguese cab drivers blocked access to Lisbon International Airport to protest government plans to legalize and regulate ridesharing companies.

In December 2017, Uber was ruled to be illegal in Portugal.

In November 2018, Uber and ride sharing became legal again with the so-called 'Uber law'. Law 45/2018 established a legal framework for individual and paid passenger transport in 'ordinary' vehicles based on an electronic platform referred to as TVDE. This allowed ride sharing companies to operate again with licensed TVDE operators. TVDE operators would need to have held a driving license for a minimum of three years, and have completed a specific training course covering communication, interpersonal relationships, and professionalism.

=== Romania ===
In May 2015, the Romanian Parliament adopted a law which banned transport services by unauthorized drivers, effectively making Uber illegal; however, Uber continues to operate in Romania as it battles in the courts.

In June 2018, Uber was banned in Cluj.

On June 25, 2019, the Romanian Government passed an emergency ordinance which regulates alternative transport servicies, such as Uber and Bolt. The law came into effect on February 1, 2020.

=== Saudi Arabia ===
In March 2017, Saudi Arabia banned Uber and Careem from picking up at the airport, citing license requirements. Saudi Arabia had earlier banned the ridesharing companies from allowing non-Saudis to register as drivers.

=== Singapore ===
On February 10, 2017, the Singapore Land Transport Authority (LTA) ruled that private hire cars who used Uber or Grab service are not exempted from the child seat requirement. For safety reasons, all vehicles in Singapore must have booster seats or child restraints for passengers under 1.35m in height.

In March 2017, LTA introduced a new regulation for private hire cars called Private Hire Car Driver's Vocational Licence (PDVL) which took effect in July 2017. This is to ensure that commuter's interest is better protected.

In September 2018, Singapore required that drivers cannot be exclusive to Grab, in an attempt to open the ridesharing market to competition.

In September 2020, Singapore required that drivers will now have to be at least 30 years old and be Singapore citizens, in a move that could reduce the industry's current glut of drivers. Previously, both Singaporeans and permanent residents (PRs) were eligible to apply for a PDVL, as long as they had held a driving licence for two years. This meant drivers could be as young as 20.

=== South Africa ===
Over 300 vehicles operating for the Uber service in Cape Town were impounded in 2015. Local transport officials claimed that the service was operating without suitable permits.

In Cape Town, on June 3, 2016, metered taxi drivers blockaded the road to the city's airport and forced passengers out of vehicles whilst attacking Uber drivers.

In July 2018, in Johannesburg, Uber and taxi drivers initiated a strike action, blocking roads and, in 3 cases, taking the phones of drivers that did not participate in the strike.

In August 2018, Uber opposed a new law that would prohibit the company from allowing drivers to operate without a license, subject to a fine of up to R100,000, claiming that many drivers were facing delays in getting permits from government agencies.

=== South Korea ===
The Seoul city government released an official statement in July 2014 expressing its intention to ban Uber. The government stated that South Korean law prohibits fee-paying transport services that use unregistered private or rented vehicles, and a Seoul driver received a one-million won (US$974) fine in April 2014 after using Uber to solicit customers in a rented car. The city government also initiated a police investigation of Uber in June 2014, but the request was suspended due to a lack of evidence; however, the July statement indicated that the investigation would be recommenced.

In December 2014, Uber announced that the Seoul Central District Prosecutors' Office had issued an indictment against both the company and Kalanick in regard to the violation of a Korean law prohibiting individuals or firms without appropriate license from providing or facilitating transportation services.

In March 2015, Uber suspended its UberX service in Korea after disputes with officials.

=== Spain ===
On December 9, 2014, In the absence of any legal provision for private hire, a judge ordered Uber to cease all activities in Spain. In a statement after the ruling, the Spanish court stated that drivers "lack the administrative authorisation to carry out the job, and the activity they carry out constitutes unfair competition." The company suspended its operations in Spain on December 30, 2014.

Uber restarted operations in Spain in March 2016, this time using only licensed drivers.

In August 2018, Spanish drivers ended a 6-day strike after the government agreed to set limits on licenses for ridesharing companies.

=== Switzerland ===
In August 2017, Uber suspended its UberPOP service in Zürich following controversy over its legality. It still operates the service in Basel and Geneva.

=== Taiwan ===
As of December 6, 2014, Uber Taiwan had received over NT$1,000,000 in fines for operating illegally, including a cease and desist of the app, on December 5, 2014. Issues included failure to insure vehicles, operating like a business without a business license, metered fares unknown to passengers, metered fares not inspected by the Ministry of Transportation and Communication, and failure to report income and pay taxes. Many drivers had their licenses suspended for violations. In December 2014, the Ministry of Transportation and Communications announced that the company was operating unlicensed taxis in violation of national law, and that the government was considering blocking the service.

Uber was fined 231 million Taiwan dollars ($7.4 million) over two weeks after new rules introduced on January 6, 2017. On February 2, 2017, Uber announced it will suspend its service in Taiwan after the fines.

In April 2017, Uber restarted service in Taiwan.

A 2019 amendment to Article 103-1 of the Transportation Management Regulations, dubbed the "Uber clause," barred rideshare companies from forming partnerships with vehicle rental agencies. That same year, Taiwan began to offer multipurpose taxi service driver exams. Drivers for such services do not have to use yellow vehicles, and are paid a metered fare, but passengers must use an app to make initial contact.

=== Turkey ===
On June 2, 2018, following pressure from Istanbul taxi drivers, President Recep Tayyip Erdoğan declared that Uber is "finished" in Turkey. The company's website and app were banned from operation a year later in October 2019 following an Istanbul Commercial Court decision that claimed that Uber's cars were improperly licensed as tourism transportation vehicles.

In December 2020, a local court lifted the ban, allowing Uber to work alongside taxi drivers.

In June 2023, the Supreme Court upheld the ban on Uber's UberXL service.

=== Thailand ===
Following concerns raised by taxi drivers in Thailand over Uber's lower rates, Uber was declared illegal on November 28, 2014 under Thailand's Motor Vehicle Act B.E. 2522, claiming that Uber vehicles are not properly registered in Thailand, Thai Uber drivers are not properly licensed, and that Uber discriminates against people who do not possess credit cards. Following the announcement, Uber drivers faced a maximum 4,000-baht fine if caught by police.

In May 2016, Uber was forced to shut its motorcycle taxi service.

In March 2017, Thai transport authorities began a crackdown on ridesharing companies such as Grab and Uber and urged the government to ban them.

=== United Arab Emirates ===
==== Abu Dhabi ====
Uber launched in Abu Dhabi in 2013. In August 2016, Uber and Careem were suspended in Abu Dhabi after some drivers were detained over regulation violations. Careem resumed operation in December 2016.

Uber restarted service in Abu Dhabi in November 2018.

==== Dubai ====
Dubai-based Careem launched in 2012.

Uber launched in Dubai in 2013. In January 2017, after a long spat with regulators, Uber signed an agreement with the Roads and Transport Authority of Dubai and became fully regulated. Under this deal, Uber is entitled to deploy about 14,000 vehicles around the city per the law of transportation companies in Dubai.

=== United Kingdom ===
On October 28, 2016, in the case of Aslam v Uber BV, the Central London Employment tribunal ruled that Uber drivers are "workers", rather than self-employed individuals, and are entitled to the minimum wage under the National Minimum Wage Act 1998, paid holiday, and other normal worker entitlements. Two Uber drivers had brought the test case to the employment tribunal with the assistance of the GMB Union, on behalf of a group of drivers in London. Uber appealed the decision. Two Uber drivers had brought the case to the employment tribunal with the assistance of the GMB Union on 20 July 2016. On November 10, the court upheld the ruling against Uber's appeal. In December 2018, Uber lost an appeal at the Court of Appeal, but was granted permission to appeal to the Supreme Court of the United Kingdom.

In November 2018, Uber was fined £385,000 under the Data Protection Act 1998 for a data breach affecting 35 million users worldwide, and more detailed data from 3.7 million drivers including their weekly pay.

==== London ====
On 11 June 2014, London-based Hackney carriage (black cab) drivers, members of the Licensed Taxi Drivers Association, disrupted traffic as a protest against Transport for London's refusal to stop Uber's calculation of fares based on distance and time taken, as they claimed it infringes upon their right to be the sole users of taximeters in London. The following week, London mayor Boris Johnson stated it would be "difficult" for him to ban Uber "without the risk of a judicial review"; however, he expressed sympathy for the view of the black-cab drivers. On October 16, 2015, after Transport for London brought a case to the High Court of Justice to determine whether the way Uber's app calculates a fare falls under the definition of a taximeter, it was ruled that the app is legal in London.

On September 22, 2017 Transport for London announced that it would not renew the license of Uber's local service provider, which was due to expire at the end of that month. Transport for London declared that Uber London Limited was not "fit and proper" to hold a private hire operator license, citing concerns over the company's approach to reporting serious criminal offences, obtaining medical certificates and Disclosure and Barring Service checks, and the use of Uber#Greyball. Uber indicated that it would appeal the decision. On June 26, 2018, Westminster Magistrates' Court granted a license for 15 months with additional conditions. Uber had applied for a 5-year license.

==== York ====
On December 12, 2017 York's Gambling, Licensing & Regulatory Committee voted to deny the renewal of Uber's license due to a data breach in 2016 and several complaints against the company and drivers. Uber appealed with QC Philip Kolvin, taking City of York Council to the Magistrates.

Uber withdrew from the appeal on March 14, 2018 with the plan to reapply for the license. In November 2018, the city looked into the legality of Uber after a legal expert claimed that Uber drivers are "acting as unlicensed operators".

==== Brighton and Hove ====
On May 1, 2018, Brighton and Hove City Council's licensing panel refused to renew Uber's private hire operator license in the city. It cited "significant concerns" about the car hailing app's data breach in 2016, and whether the company was adhering to its commitment to use only Brighton and Hove licensed drivers in the city. In December 2018, Uber won an appeal of the case.

=== United States ===
==== Alabama ====
In July 2018, ridesharing companies such as Uber and Lyft became legal across Alabama.

==== Alaska ====
In September 2015, Uber paid the State of Alaska $77,925 in fines and paused operations in Anchorage. The state argued that Uber was misclassifying drivers as contractors instead of employees, which was illegal.

==== Arkansas ====
A 2015 Arkansas law requires ridesharing companies to each pay a $15,000 annual fee and to vet potential drivers.

==== California ====
In May 2011, Uber received a cease-and-desist letter from the San Francisco Municipal Transportation Agency, claiming it was operating an unlicensed taxi service, and another legal demand from the California Public Utilities Commission (CPUC) that it was operating an unlicensed limousine dispatch. Both claimed criminal violations and demanded that the company cease operations. In response, the company, among other things, changed its name from UberCab to Uber. In the fall of 2012, the CPUC issued a cease-and-desist letter to Uber, Lyft, and Sidecar, and fined each $20,000. However, an interim agreement was reached in 2013 reversing those actions.

In June 2013, Lyft, Uber and Sidecar were served with cease and desist letters by the Los Angeles Department of Transportation.

In September 2013, the CPUC unanimously voted to make the agreement permanent, creating a new category of service called "transportation network company" to cover Lyft, UberX, SideCar, and Summon, thereby making California the first jurisdiction to recognize such services.

On September 17, 2014, California's Governor approved the "Assembly Bill No. 2293" bill that became effective on July 1, 2015. The bill amended "the Passenger Charter-party Carriers' Act to enact specified requirements for liability insurance coverage for transportation network companies, as defined, and their participating drivers." The driver under the law is defined as "any person who uses a vehicle in connection with a transportation network company's online-enabled application or platform to connect with passengers." The stated minimum insurance requirement ranges from US$50,000 to $100,000 for death and injuries per individual or incident, and stipulates US$30,000 for property damage. As a breach of the bill is classified as a criminal act, a corresponding "state-mandated local program" will be implemented.

In April 2016, a case that was originally filed on December 9, 2014, by the district attorneys of both Los Angeles, and San Francisco was resolved. Prosecutors claimed that Uber made misleading statements about the background checks it performs on drivers and falsely charged a "safe ride fee." The case was resolved when Uber agreed to no longer claim to be the "safest ride on the road", change the name of the "safe ride fee" to "booking fee", and pay $10 million. San Francisco's city attorneys had previously settled out of court with Lyft over similar allegations.

On December 14, 2016, the California Department of Motor Vehicles demanded that Uber cease its autonomous car program in San Francisco or obtain a licence, threatening legal action. Following the invitation of tech enthusiast and Arizona Governor Doug Ducey, Uber decided to move its fleet to Phoenix, Arizona.

==== Colorado ====
In June 2014, Colorado became the first state to pass rules for ridesharing companies through the legislative process, when S 125 was signed into law.

==== District of Columbia ====
In January 2012, an Uber driver's car was impounded as part of a sting by the Washington, D.C. taxicab commission. The commissioner said the company was operating an unlicensed taxicab service in the city. Following a social media campaign by Uber riders, the D.C. city council voted in July 2012 to formally legalize ridesharing companies, which led to protests by taxicab drivers. The Washington, D.C. City Council passed legislation in September 2013 to allow ridesharing companies to operate.

==== Florida ====
In July 2017, a new law regulating ridesharing companies in Florida went into effect. The law requires background checks on all drivers.

==== Georgia ====
In September 2014, a class-action lawsuit was filed by taxicab drivers claiming that Uber drivers were not properly licensed. The lawsuit was dismissed by the Georgia Supreme Court.

==== Hawaii ====
Regulations affecting ridesharing companies in Hawaii were proposed in 2019.

==== Idaho ====
In April 2015, a law was passed in Idaho that allows ridesharing companies to regulate themselves and not have to deal with regulations or laws imposed by city governments. The law was proposed by a lobbyist for Uber and had been opposed by certain local jurisdictions.

==== Illinois ====
On October 5, 2012, Uber was sued by the taxi and livery companies in Chicago. Uber was accused of violating Chicago city laws and Illinois state laws designed to protect public safety, consumer protection, and fair practices. Regulations affecting ridesharing companies were approved in December 2014.

==== Kansas ====
In May 2015, Uber was legalized in Kansas.

==== Kentucky ====
In December 2014, Kentucky imposed regulations on ridesharing companies that include annual licensing application, driver background checks, and driver liability insurance coverage.

==== Louisiana ====
In June 2019, Louisiana passed statewide regulations on ridesharing companies, permitting their operation statewide.

==== Massachusetts ====
On August 1, 2012, the Massachusetts Division of Standards issued a cease-and-desist letter to Uber on the grounds that the GPS-based smartphone app was not a certified measurement device, but on August 15, the agency reversed its ruling after prodding by Governor Deval Patrick, saying that technique was satisfactory because it was under study by the National Institute of Standards and Technology.

Uber worked out an arrangement with the city of Boston to share quarterly data on the duration, locations, and times of day in which riders used the app to travel in or out of the city. This information was first delivered to the city in February 2015, and the report kept all individual user data private.

The legislature passed a law formally legalizing and regulating ridesharing companies in July 2016. The law requires background checks, vehicle decals and inspections, insurance, state certification of drivers; prohibits increased fares during a declared emergency or for passengers with disabilities; requires drivers to be 21 or older; and sets up a complaint process and commission to review the economics of the whole ride-for-hire industry. Unlike taxis, rideshare vehicles are prohibited from "cruising" for passengers on streets. The law also establishes a $0.20 per-ride charge, which is distributed to cities and towns for transportation and ride-for-hire economic development purposes.

On July 14, 2020, the Massachusetts attorney general filed a lawsuit seeking a court ruling that Uber and Lyft drivers are employees under Massachusetts Wage and Hour Laws, a designation that will allow drivers access to critical labor rights and benefits, such as minimum wage, overtime, and earned sick time.

==== Michigan ====
In December 2016, Michigan instituted regulations on ridesharing companies.

==== Minnesota ====
In July 2014, the Minneapolis City Council voted almost unanimously to legalize ridesharing companies.

In March 2024, the Minneapolis City Council overrode a mayoral veto to pass a minimum pay requirement. The city ordinance will require the ride share companies to pay a minimum of $1.40 per mile and 51 cents per minute.

==== Mississippi ====
In April 2016, statewide regulations governing ridesharing companies in Mississippi were implemented.

In May 2017, officials in Jackson, Mississippi wanted more regulations on ridesharing companies.

==== Missouri ====
In April 2017, ridesharing companies were legalized statewide in Missouri after a law was passed that requires ridesharing companies to institute driver background checks and pay a licensing fee.

==== Nebraska ====
In July 2015, Uber received approval to legally operate in Nebraska.

In October 2017, taxi drivers in Lincoln, Nebraska petitioned the government to require rideshare drivers to undergo background checks and physical exams.

==== Nevada ====
On November 25, 2014, Washoe County, Nevada District Court Judge Scott Freeman, issued a preliminary injunction preventing Uber from operating statewide. The temporary injunction was based on the company's failure to file a certificate of public convenience and necessity, which is required for every transportation service in Nevada. The Government of Nevada also claimed that Uber's screening process was not rigorous enough to protect consumers, and failed to conform with the aforementioned regulations. Uber contested the ruling, arguing that it is an app-based technology company rather than a transportation company, but the company's management made the decision to temporarily shut down its Nevada operations. Nevada legalized ridesharing companies in May 2015.

==== New Hampshire ====
Legislation passed in 2016 in New Hampshire requires each ridesharing company (not each driver) to pay an annual fee of $500. It also includes requirements that each company get a permit from the state, obtain a driver history report on each driver that meets the provisions of the law, and require their drivers to have liability insurance.

==== New York ====
UberX was suspended in New York City in October 2012 after pressure from the New York City Taxi and Limousine Commission. Uber's premium sedan service was not affected.

In February 2017, the New York State Senate approved legislation allowing ridesharing companies to expand operations to Upstate New York and Uber began service there in June 2017.

In 2018, New York City became the first jurisdiction to set a minimum pay rate. The city set a minimum pay rate of $17.22 per hour.

==== North Carolina ====
In September 2015, Governor Pat McCrory signed a law regulating ridesharing companies. It also forbids the establishment by county and municipal governments of additional regulations upon ridesharing companies and drivers.

==== Ohio ====
In December 2015, regulations governing ridesharing companies in Ohio were implemented. ridesharing companies must pay a $5,000 permit fee and conduct driver background checks.

==== Oregon ====
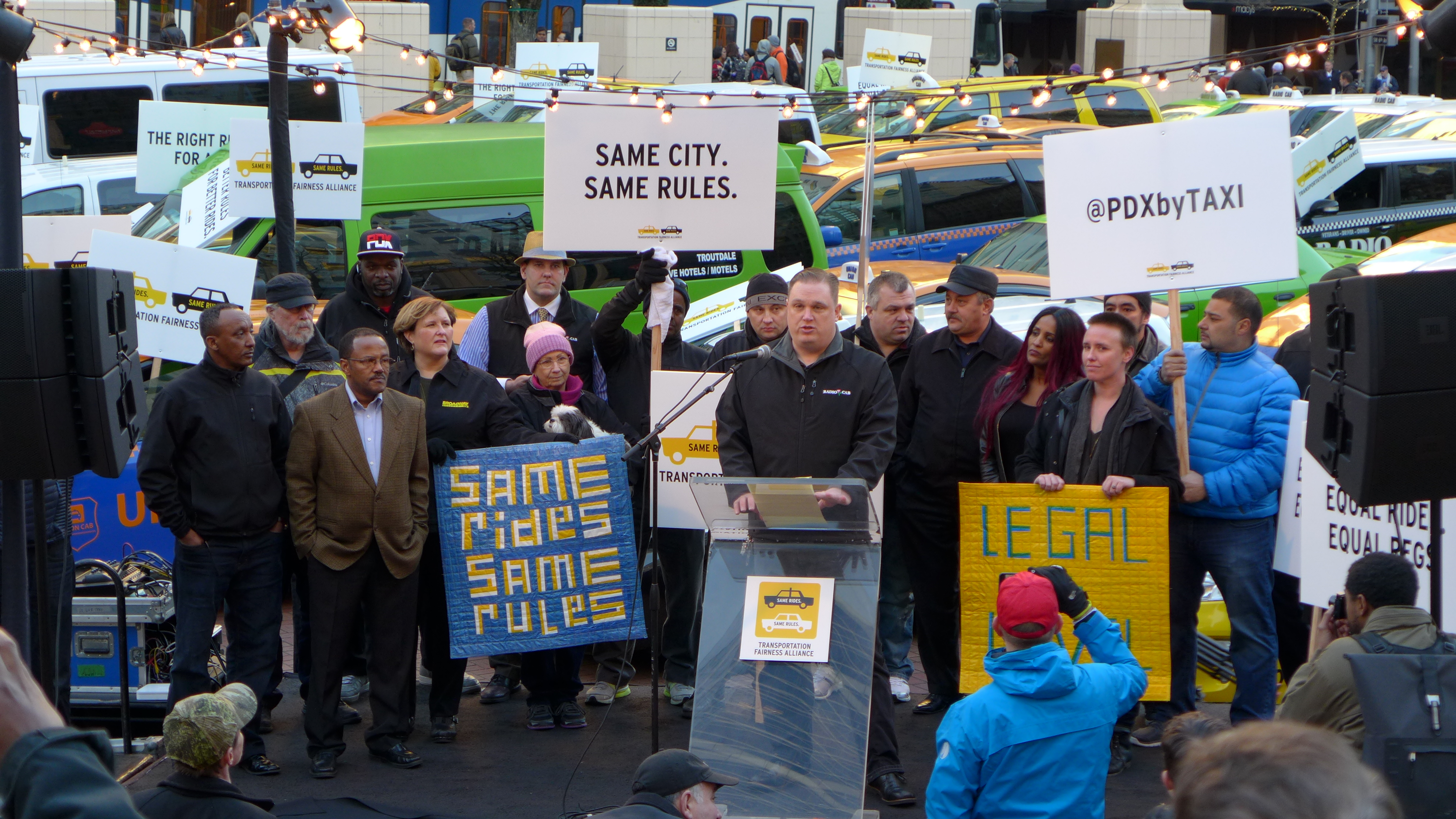
A protest against Uber in Portland, Oregon in January 2015

On December 8, 2014, Portland, Oregon sued Uber, claiming that Uber violates the city's Private for Hire Transportation Regulations and Administrative Rules. The court was asked to stop Uber from operating in Portland. Uber suspended its operations in the city for 3 months, pending planned changes to local regulations.

==== Oklahoma ====
In February 2016, regulators ratified new rules for ridesharing companies such as Uber and Lyft.

==== Pennsylvania ====
On July 1, 2014, after implementing fines on Uber and Lyft, the Pennsylvania Public Utility Commission imposed a cease-and-desist order on the companies.

===== Pittsburgh =====
In December 2014, Uber and Lyft received two-year experimental licenses.

In June 2015, Uber drivers became eligible to pick up riders at Pittsburgh International Airport.

===== Philadelphia =====
In December 2014, Checker Cab Philadelphia and 44 other taxi companies in Philadelphia filed a lawsuit alleging that Uber was operating illegally in the city. On March 3, 2015, U.S. District Judge Nitza I. Quinones Alejandro denied a motion for a preliminary injunction against Uber.

In January 2016, a $1.5M lawsuit was filed against Uber in Philadelphia by Philadelphia taxicab medallion owners, claiming that Uber engaged in tortious interference and engaged in false advertising under the Lanham Act. The case was dismissed in August 2016.

Philadelphia legalized ridesharing companies in November 2016.

==== Texas ====
May 2017, Texas HB100 made the regulation of rideshare companies an exclusive power of the state of Texas. HB100 requires annual background checks of drivers but does not require fingerprinting.

===== Austin =====
In March 2015, UberPOOL began operations in Austin, Texas in advance of the annual South by Southwest festival.

On May 7, 2016, Uber and Lyft announced they would no longer provide service in Austin after city voters rejected a referendum backed by the ridesharing companies that would have repealed a city ordinance requiring their drivers to submit to fingerprint-based background checks.

May 2017, regulations pertaining to Austin were overridden by Texas HB100, and Uber and Lyft resumed operations in Austin.

===== Houston =====
In late 2016, Uber threatened to leave Houston ahead of Super Bowl LI, insisting various city regulations, including fingerprint background checks of drivers, were too burdensome. Houston officials and Uber reached a compromise in December 2016, whereby Houston would continue to require a fingerprint check for drivers but eliminate requirements for driver drug testing and physicals through at least February 5, 2017.

May 2017, Regulations pertaining to Houston were overridden by Texas HB100.

==== Tennessee ====
Regulations affecting ridesharing companies were implemented in December 2014.

==== Virginia ====
On June 5, 2014, the Virginia Department of Motor Vehicles issued a cease-and-desist letter to both Uber and Lyft, demanding they halt operations within Virginia. In February 2015, ridesharing companies were legalized in Virginia.

==== Washington ====
In March 2014, to appease taxi drivers, the Seattle City Council passed an ordinance in March 2014 that capped the number of drivers from any ridesharing company on the road at any given time to 150. However, on April 17, 2014, after a coalition obtained 36,000 signatures to put the question to voters in a referendum, Mayor Ed Murray announced a 45-day negotiation process to find an alternative approach. Uber donated over $613,000 to "Seattle Citizens to Repeal Ordinance 124441", a political group seeking to overturn the ordinance limiting the number of rideshare vehicles in Seattle. In June 2014, the mayor reached a deal to legalize ridesharing companies with no driver limits. The compromise was passed by the city council in July 2014.

In December 2018, Spokane instituted licensing requirements that require drivers for ridesharing companies to pay license fees on par with those paid by taxicab drivers.

==== Wisconsin ====
In May 2015, Governor Scott Walker signed legislation making it easier for ridesharing companies such as Uber and Lyft to operate without local regulation and oversight.

In August 2017, state senators introduced a bill supported by the taxi industry that would require ridesharing companies to conduct criminal background checks including fingerprint checks on all drivers.

=== Ukraine ===
In February 2016, taxi drivers protested in Kyiv against the lack of licensing requirements for rideshare drivers.

On March 30, 2017, taxi drivers protested against Uber and Yandex.Taxi in Lviv.
