= Figure Technology Solutions =

American financial technology company

Figure Technology Solutions, Inc.
- Formerly: FT Intermediate, Inc.
- Type: Public
- Traded as: Nasdaq: FIGR (Class A); Russell 1000 component
- Industry: Financial technology
- Founded: 2018; 8 years ago
- Founders: Mike Cagney; June Ou
- Headquarters: Reno, Nevada, U.S.
- Revenue: ▲US$507 million (2025)
- Net income: ▲US$134 million (2025)
- Total assets: ▲US$2.32 billion (2025)
- Total equity: ▲US$1.23 billion (2025)
- Website: figure.com

Figure Technology Solutions, Inc. is a financial technology company in Reno, Nevada, United States. Established in 2018, it develops and operates blockchain-based platforms used in lending, capital markets, and asset management.

The company provides consumer and institutional lending products, including HELOCs, cash-out refinance, DSCR loans, and crypto-backed loans, as well as a consumer credit marketplace, Figure Connect.

== History ==
Figure Technology Solutions was established in 2018 by Mike Cagney and June Ou. The company launched with a focus on integrating blockchain technology into financial services to automate and standardize loan origination and securitization processes, reducing reliance on traditional infrastructure throughout the loan lifecycle.

In its early phase, Figure introduced Home Equity Line of Credit (HELOC) on blockchain infrastructure and developed Provenance Blockchain, which became the foundation for its services. Figure was the first company to place consumer loans on a blockchain. The company expanded its product portfolio and deployed lending and securitization processes using automated systems to include cash-out refinance loans.

Between 2021 and 2022, Figure's lending technology was integrated into the platforms of different financial institutions. Its products were offered under private-label agreements by banks, credit unions, and mortgage brokers. Customers applying through partner companies such as Guaranteed Rate were serviced through Figure's infrastructure.

In 2024, Figure expanded its offerings to include additional consumer and institutional lending products such as Intellidebt, a tool for debt consolidation that is embedded into the loan application process, and crypto-backed loans, allowing Bitcoin and Ethereum holders to borrow against holdings. The company also launched Figure Markets, an all-in-one marketplace that integrates traditional finance, crypto, and decentralized finance, and Figure Connect, a consumer credit marketplace for originating and trading tokenized home equity, mortgage, and other consumer loans.

In addition, in 2024, the company appointed Michael Tannenbaum as chief executive officer, Macrina Kgil as chief financial officer, and Ron Chillemi as its chief legal officer.

By 2025, Figure had facilitated more than $17 billion in home equity lending across the United States. That same year, Figure expanded its offerings to include additional consumer and institutional lending products such as Piggyback second mortgages, DSCR (Debt Service Coverage Ratio) loans, and HELOCs for seniors with Longbridge Financial.

In August 2025, Figure merged with its former subsidiary, Figure Markets. This merger brought together lending, trading, and yield-generation functions into a unified system on the Provenance Blockchain. The company launched Democratized Prime, a platform that allows institutional users and regular investors to lend and borrow using tokenized collateral. They were the first to offer a real-world asset (RWA) lending pool backed by HELOCs. Figure Markets also became the first company to receive U.S. Securities and Exchange Commission (SEC) approval for a public, yield-bearing stablecoin, $YLDS. In addition, the company applied for an Initial Public Offering (IPO) in the same year.

=== Funding ===
Figure Technology Solutions began its funding journey with seed capital in early 2018, reaching a post-money valuation of approximately $100 million. Later that year, it closed a Series A round at about a $150 million valuation.

In early 2019, Figure raised a Series B round with over $65 million, bringing its valuation to approximately $380 million. Later in the same year, a Series C round generated over $100 million at a valuation near $1.2 billion.

In May 2021, Figure completed a Series D funding round of $200 million at a $3.2 billion valuation. The round was co-led by 10T Holdings and Morgan Creek Digital, with participation from Apollo Global Management (affiliates), DST Global, Ribbit Capital, Digital Currency Group, HCM Capital, DCM Ventures, RPM Ventures, Blockchain.com, Endeavour Capital, L1 Digital, Goldentree Asset Management, National Bank Holdings, Rockaway Blockchain, and HOF Capital. Apollo Global Management also entered into a strategic collaboration with Figure to develop blockchain-based initiatives through the Provenance blockchain.

In February 2025, Figure and Sixth Street formed a joint venture in which Sixth Street committed $200 million in equity to Figure Connect. This commitment was structured to provide ongoing liquidity for private credit assets, including home equity lines of credit (HELOCs), allowing for future recycling and supporting scale in the private credit marketplace.

In September 2025, Figure went public on Nasdaq under the ticker FIGR. The company is valued at $7.6 billion.

== Operations and technology ==
Figure's operations are built on Provenance Blockchain, which is a public protocol developed to support financial services. The company's systems use smart contracts and tokenization to manage various stages of the loan lifecycle. These tools are designed to replace manual processes and reduce transaction costs.

By 2025, Figure was operating across different financial products. These included home equity lines of credit, cash-out refinance loans, DSCR loans, second mortgages, reverse-mortgage alternatives for seniors, and debt payoff tools. Institutional offerings included lending pools and digital asset platforms. As of 2025, the company's infrastructure was used by 168 active partners and 27 Figure Connect partners (originators and buyers).

Figure also developed systems for trading and managing blockchain-based assets. With the launch of Democratized Prime and $YLDS, the company began offering services that connect capital to tokenized real-world and digital assets. In 2025, Provenance Blockchain was reported to have the largest volume of real-world financial assets among public blockchains. The figure was estimated to hold approximately 75% of the market for tokenized real-world assets.

== Recognition ==
In 2024, Figure Technology Solutions was named to Fast Company's list of the World’s Most Innovative Companies. It was listed again in 2025. In the same year, the company was included in the Forbes Fintech 50 list and received an AAA rating from the Better Business Bureau.
