= Tokenized private placement =

A tokenized private placement is a form of digital securities offering that combines traditional private placement structures with blockchain technology to create tradeable digital tokens representing ownership stakes in private companies or assets. This emerging financial technology allows companies, particularly small and medium-sized enterprises (SMEs), to raise capital while providing investors with potentially greater liquidity compared to conventional private placements.

== Overview ==
Tokenized private placements represent an evolution of traditional private placement offerings, utilizing blockchain technology to create digital representations of securities. Unlike conventional private placements, which typically involve physical certificates and limited transferability, tokenized versions can potentially offer enhanced liquidity through secondary trading on regulated platforms.

The concept emerged as part of the broader security token offering (STO) movement, which seeks to apply blockchain technology to traditional financial instruments while maintaining compliance with existing securities regulations.

== Regulatory framework ==
The Securities and Exchange Commission has emphasized that the application of blockchain technology does not change the fundamental nature of securities regulations. The SEC's Division of Corporation Finance has issued guidance stating that tokenized securities must comply with the same disclosure and registration requirements as traditional securities.

=== Alternative Trading Systems ===
Many tokenized private placement platforms operate as alternative trading systems (ATS) to provide secondary market liquidity. An ATS must register with the SEC as a broker-dealer and comply with Regulation ATS, which includes specific reporting and operational requirements.

== See also ==
- Security token offering
- Private placement
- Alternative trading system
- Regulation D
- Digital asset
- Blockchain
- Financial technology
