= Bill.com =

American technology company

BILL Holdings, Inc.
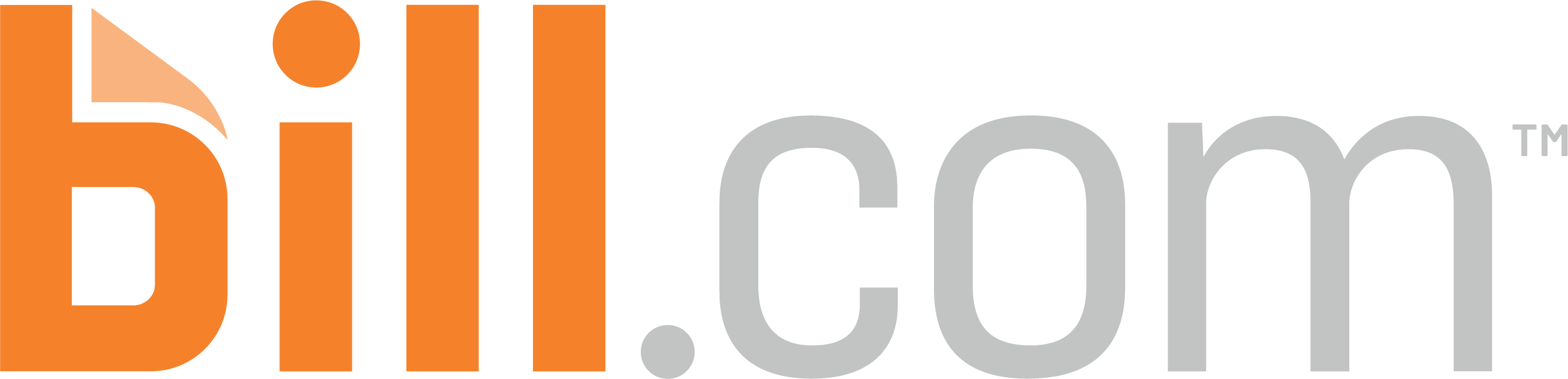
- Formerly: Bill.com Holdings, Inc.
- Company type: Public
- Traded as: NYSE: BILL; S&P 400 component
- Industry: Financial technology
- Founded: April 2006; 20 years ago as Cashboard, Inc.
- Founder: René Lacerte
- Headquarters: San Jose, California, U.S.
- Key people: René Lacerte (CEO)
- Revenue: ▲US$1.29 billion (2024)
- Operating income: ▲US$−174 million (2024)
- Net income: ▲US$−29 million (2024)
- Total assets: ▼US$9.18 billion (2024)
- Total equity: ▲US$4.13 billion (2024)
- Number of employees: 2,187 (2024)
- Subsidiaries: Invoice2go
- Website: bill.com

BILL Holdings, Inc. is an American company based in San Jose, California, that provides automated, cloud-based software for financial operations for small businesses in the United States. A white-labeled, end-to-end payments automation platform, Bill.com Connect is offered to financial institutions as part of their single sign-on online business banking ecosystem.

== History ==
=== 2004–2010 ===
René Lacerte, who co-founded and led an online payroll software startup PayCycle, stepped down as its CEO in November 2004 per the decision of the Board. Lacerte soon started working on his next company, which eventually became Bill.com. Founded in April 2006 as Cashboard, Inc., the company enables small businesses to pay their bills and keep their books in the cloud. Its early investors included August Capital and DCM Ventures.

=== 2019–2025 ===
In October 2019, Bill.com started offering new capabilities to help companies automate their AP/AR functions.

Bill.com completed its initial public offering (IPO) on the New York Stock Exchange in December 2019. In early 2020, Bill.com moved its headquarters from Palo Alto to San Jose, California.

In June 2021, Bill.com paid $2.5 billion to acquire Divvy, an expense-management company that modernizes small business finances by combining software and corporate smart cards into a single platform. Later that September, the company closed the acquisition of Invoice2go for $625 million, an AR mobile-first company, extending the company's reach to serve sole proprietors.

In 2025, the Financial Times reported that the hedge fund Elliott Management had acquired a large stake in Bill Holdings. Reuters then reported that Elliott owned roughly 5% of Bill Holdings. Activist investor Starboard Value had also acquired an 8.5% stake in BILL Holdings, with reports it intended to push for changes. In early 2025, Starboard and the company Autodesk reached a settlement to add two independent directors to the BILL board, while in March, Kenvue agreed to add three directors to the board. Starboard nominated four to the BILL Holdings board in September 2025, with four of BILL's 12 directors standing for election at the upcoming annual meeting. In September 2025, BILL Holdings had a market value of around $5 billion.

In November 2025, Bloomberg reported that BILL Holdings was exploring strategic options including a potential sale, amid pressure from activist investors Starboard Value and Elliott Management. In December 2025, activist investor Barington Capital also disclosed a stake and urged the board to consider a sale. By February 2026, Hellman & Friedman was reported to be in talks for a potential buyout.
