= Anthony Noto =

American businessman (born 1968)

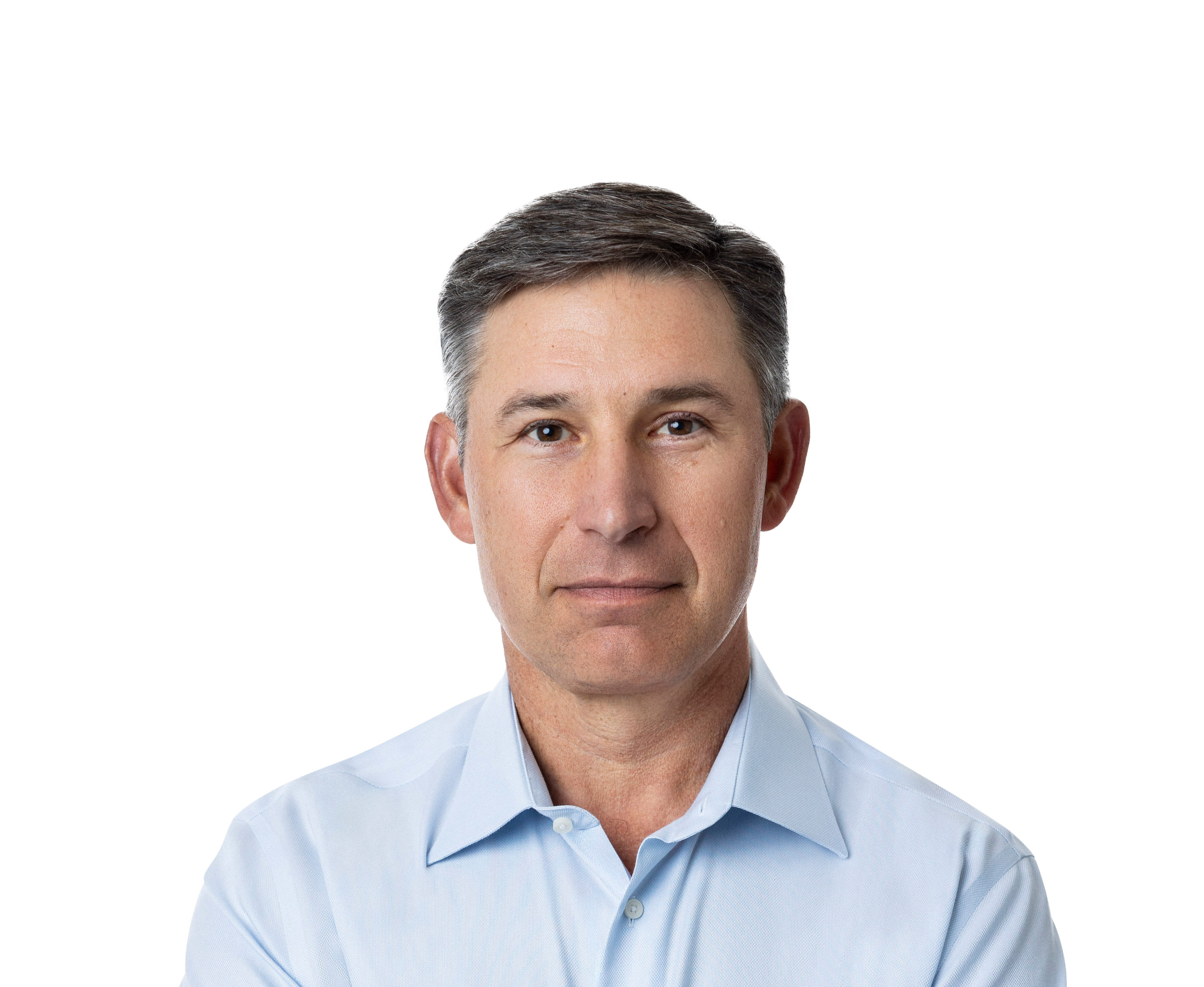
- Born: Anthony Joseph Noto; May 2, 1968 (age 58); Poughkeepsie, New York, US
- Education: United States Military Academy; Wharton School of Business (MBA)
- Occupation: Businessman
- Known for: Former COO, Twitter
- Title: CEO, SoFi (Social Finance, Inc)
- Term: 2018–
- Spouse: Kristin Noto
- Children: 5

Anthony Noto (born 2 May 1968) is an American businessman and the CEO of SoFi. Previously, he was a managing director at Goldman Sachs, CFO of the National Football League, COO of Twitter, and head of Twitter Ventures.

== Early life and education ==
Anthony Noto is the son of Roseanne Niet (who died in 2015) and George Noto Sr. He has two siblings, George Noto and Thomas Noto. His brother Thomas died in 2018. He has 5 children with his wife, Kristin Noto. Noto graduated from Franklin D. Roosevelt High School in Hyde Park, New York. He attended the United States Military Academy at West Point, where he was a star linebacker on the football team, earning All-East and Academic All-American honors. In 1991, Noto was the highest-ranked mechanical engineering major in his graduating class. After graduating from Army Ranger School at Fort Benning, Noto served as a Communications Officer with the 24th Infantry Division in Fort Stewart, Georgia.

After serving in the military, Noto attended business school at the University of Chicago, while working at Kraft Foods as a brand manager, and later received an MBA from the Wharton School of Business in 1999.

== Career ==
=== Goldman Sachs and NFL ===
Noto joined Goldman Sachs in 1999 and was voted the top analyst by Institutional Investor magazine for research on the Internet industry. Noto led the firm’s communications, media and entertainment research team at Goldman Sachs. He became a managing director in 2003, and a partner in 2004.

On 24 February 2008, Noto took over the job of CFO for the National Football League, a position left vacant since former CFO, Barbara Kaczynski, left in February 2003. Noto held the position until October 2010, but left just prior to the negotiations which led up to the 2011 lockout. He returned to Goldman Sachs in October 2010 as the co-head of Goldman’s global media group. In 2013, Noto helped the company win the role of lead underwriter for Twitter's initial public offering. Noto would work as the main banker dealing with Twitter.

=== Coatue and Twitter ===
In May 2014, Noto announced that he would be leaving Goldman Sachs to join the New York-based hedge fund Coatue Management LLC. However, on 1 July 2014, Twitter CEO Dick Costolo announced that Noto would join Twitter as the company's CFO. The two men built a good relationship the previous year when Noto managed Twitter's account while at Goldman Sachs.

=== SoFi ===
On January 20, 2018, it was confirmed that Noto was leaving Twitter to become the CEO of SoFi (Social Finance, Inc.). In 2019, Noto closed a 20-year naming rights deal with the Los Angeles Rams and Los Angeles Chargers; the stadium was named SoFi Stadium and hosted Super Bowl LVI. Noto initiated the firm’s IPO in June 2021, trading at $8.65 billion. Noto oversaw SoFi's purchase of Galileo Financial Services in 2020, Technisys SA in 2022 and Wyndham Capital Mortgage in 2023.
