= Credible (company) =

American financial technology company

- Logo as of 2021
- Company type: Subsidiary
- Website type: Financial technology
- Founded: November 20, 2012; 13 years ago
- Headquarters: San Francisco, California, {{{location_country}}}
- Key people: Stephen Dash (CEO, founder)
- Industry: Personal finance; Fintech
- Products: Online consumer marketplace for financial products, including loan refinancing and mortgages
- Parent: Tubi Media Group (Fox Corporation) (67%)
- Website: credible.com

Credible is a financial technology company headquartered in San Francisco and incorporated under the name Credible Labs Inc. The company also does business through its subsidiary Credible Operations, Inc. Its online marketplace offers consumers the ability to compare and refinance loans, mortgages, and other financial products from lenders. Credible became a subsidiary of Fox Corporation in 2019.

== Products and services ==
The Credible marketplace allows consumers to compare financial products from multiple providers side by side. The company itself is not a lender, a bank, or a credit card issuer. Instead, its integrations with lenders and credit bureaus allow the company to provide pre-qualified rates based on a consumer's credit history, a capability that distinguished the company from comparison sites that only provide generic rate information. Dash has analogized Credible's business model to those of travel search engines like Kayak and Expedia, which show ticket prices for specific bookings and allow users to comparison-shop among competing offers, noting that Credible offers a similar platform for financial services. By 2018, the company's marketplace included 38 lending partners.

The company's platform is primarily accessible through its website and has also become available through integrations with third-parties like Radius Bank, Fidelity Investments, and Morgan Stanley.

== History ==
The company was founded in 2012 by Australian entrepreneur Stephen Dash. Credible originated as a platform for refinancing student loans. Its online consumer loan marketplace has subsequently expanded to include loan origination, credit cards, personal loans, and mortgages.

The company was incorporated in Delaware on November 20, 2012, as Stampede Labs Inc., before changing its name to Credible in December 2013. The company has been headquartered in San Francisco since its founding. American investor Ron Suber sat as chairperson of Credible's board of directors between 2015 and 2019. Australian businessman Alex Waislitz was an early investor.

In December 2017, Credible Labs became a public company via an initial public offering on the Australian Securities Exchange (ASX). It was the year's largest technology IPO on the ASX, raising US$50 million. Dash chose the ASX because Credible's early investors were predominantly located in Australia and Asia and because they believed there was a relative scarcity of financial technology companies on the ASX as compared to the major American stock exchanges.

In 2018, the company opened a second office in Durham, North Carolina, to expand its marketplace to mortgages. At launch, the company initially offered mortgage brokerage services in 20 states. As of January 2021, it maintained active mortgage broker's licenses in 47 states through its subsidiary, Credible Operations, Inc. By August 2019, Credible employed 135 people across its two offices.

In October 2019, Fox Corporation acquired a 67-percent majority ownership stake in Credible for US$265 million (equivalent to A$585 million). At first, the terms of the deal were questioned by earlier investors like Waislitz, who expressed concern that the acquisition would represent a "bargain" because he believed the company's valuation had the potential for rapid growth in the near future. Nonetheless, Credible's stockholders unanimously voted to approve the acquisition on October 14. As a result of the acquisition, Credible became a privately held company again and was delisted from the ASX.

In December 2021, Credible acquired digital insurance platform Young Alfred, adding various kinds of insurance including home, auto, and pet to its platform.
