= Invoice2go =

Former business software company

- Type: Subsidiary
- Founded: 2002
- Founder: Chris Strode
- Headquarters: Sydney, Australia and Palo Alto, CA, United States
- Area served: Worldwide
- Key people: Mark Lenhard (CEO), Sean Deorsey (CFO)
- Number of employees: 105
- Parent: Bill.com
- Website: invoice.2go.com

Invoice2go is a mobile and web app designed as a simple invoicing, expense-tracking, and reporting tool for micro and small business owners. Headed by Silicon Valley veterans CEO Mark Lenhard and CFO Sean Deorsey, this software processes $24 billion in transactions each year and is used by over 220,000 customers in more than 160 countries. It was acquired by Bill.com in 2021.

Invoice2go is dually headquartered in Silicon Valley, California and Sydney, Australia.

Invoice2go's features include tools to simplify estimates, invoicing, expense tracking, managing online payments, building an online presence, and more. The software is cloud-based and has 4 subscription tiers – Lite, Standard, Advanced, and Unlimited – based on the number of invoices, clients, and account managers.

== History ==
Invoice2go was founded in Erina, Australia in 2002. In 2009, the software went live on the iTunes app store, and by 2011, it was ranked among the top 10 business apps.

In 2014, Greg Waldorf, former CEO of eHarmony and Accel, took the lead as CEO of Invoice2go. Bizjournals reported his appointment was part of the company's expansion plan.

In 2015, The New York Times highlighted Invoice2go as one of the primary Australian and New Zealand companies attracting investors from Silicon Valley. Invoice2go also passed the milestone of having the total number of users send more than one million invoices per month.

Invoice2go raised $10 million from new and existing investors in 2018. Hemi Zucker from OCV Partners also joined the board of directors.

In 2020, Mark Lenhard (former SVP of Strategy & Growth at Magento) took over as CEO of Invoice2go. Greg Waldorf continues to serve on the company's board of directors.

In February 2021, Invoice2go brought on Sean Deorsey as CFO. He brings experience from previous financial leadership positions at high-growth companies, including Optimizely, and has guided notable companies through acquisitions and initial public offerings.

In April 2021, The Financial Technology Report named Mark Lenhard as one of the 50 fintech CEOs of 2021.

Throughout the COVID-19 pandemic, Invoice2go was praised for helping small businesses adapt by enabling them to accept online payments easily.

== Product ==
Invoice2go is available on the web, iOS, and Android. All documents instantly sync across all devices via the cloud.

Invoice2go allows users to create custom invoices and estimates, accept online payments, and get business reports. The software also has features to track time and expenses and manage appointments.

In 2020, the company released new features that allow users to create an instant website and collect detailed customer reviews more easily. The company has also recently rolled out new features that simplify online payments and enable users to accept tips.
