= Prospect Mortgage =

- Type: Private
- Industry: Finance
- Founded: 2007
- Defunct: 2017
- Headquarters: Sherman Oaks, CA, U.S.
- Area served: United States
- Key people: Mike Williams (CEO); Doug Long (President of National Lending)
- Products: Financial services
- Parent: Prospect Holding Company, LLC

Prospect Mortgage was a residential retail mortgage lender that offered a range of home loans. The company was founded in 2007 and was headquartered in Sherman Oaks, California with retail offices across the United States. The company was backed by the private equity firm Sullivan Partners. In 2011, Prospect Mortgage was ranked number 2 on Mortgage Executive Magazine's list of the "Top 100 Mortgage Companies in America", and was a top 10 national home purchase lender in 2012.

== History ==
In one of its first moves after being founded, Prospect acquired Metrocities Mortgage, LLC in 2007 via acquisition precipitated by Sterling Partners. Prospect also inherited Metrocities' assets. Prospect also acquired the retail mortgage platform of Opteum Financial Services LLC in 2007. In 2008, Prospect Mortgage acquired the IndyMac Bancorp retail mortgage branches. The purchase gave them 80 new retail offices and made Prospect one of the largest independent retail mortgage firms in the nation. The deal expand edoperations to the Midwest and the company subsequently opened an operations center in Schaumburg, Illinois. In 2009, Metrocities branches that had still been operating under that name in New York were rebranded "Prospect Lending, LLC."

In 2011, Mortgage Executive Magazine ranked Prospect Mortgage as the second-best mortgage company in America with an estimated volume of $6.9 billion and over 26,000 loans. The following year, the company added former Fannie Mae CEO Michael Williams as a chairman of the board. According to the National Mortgage News, Prospect ranked 27th among residential funders nationwide in 2012, with an estimated volume of $8.42 billion in loans.

In 2013, Prospect Mortgage loan officers accounted for 7 of the top 100 and 10 of the top 200 mortgage originators in America in 2013 according to Mortgage Executive Magazine. In January 2014, Prospect acquired the retail mortgage branch operations of Impac Mortgage, which added 12 branches to their fold. They also acquired Diamond Mortgage Group in the same month. Prospect sold the operating assets of its appraisal management subsidiary, Velocette Resource Group, in April of that year.

Ranked number nine on Mortgage Executive Magazine's list of the "Top 100 Mortgage Companies in America" in 2014, Prospect Mortgage was also named a top-15 national home purchase lender that year.

On June 18, 2014, the company announced the appointment of Michael Williams as CEO. He took over for Ronald Bergum, who transitioned into a new role as managing partner. In early 2015, Prospect (and its parent company, Prospect Holding Company) hired another former Fannie Mae employee, Joseph J. Grassi III, as EVP and general counsel. In December 2014, Prospect Mortgage announced that it would implement the Secure Settlements Inc.'s Closing Guard tool to enhance risk management policies and procedures.

In November 2015, Prospect Mortgage, LLC, acquired certain assets of CapWest Mortgage, a Stilwell, Kansas-based call center operation focused on a consumer direct source of business. Prior to the acquisition, CapWest Mortgage operated as a wholly owned division of Farmers Bank & Trust, headquartered in Great Bend, Kansas.

The same month, the California Department of Business Oversight announced that Prospect Mortgage, LLC would pay $10.1 million in borrower restitution and penalties under a national settlement that resolved allegations that the firm violated numerous federal and state laws.

In March 2016, Prospect became the number-1 203(k) lender in the nation.

Acquisition of the operating assets of Prospect Mortgage, LLC by HomeBridge Financial Services, Inc. was announced on November 1, 2016.

In January 2017, the Consumer Financial Protection Bureau ordered Prospect Mortgage to pay a $3.5 million fine for improper mortgage referrals. Prospect had agreements with over 100 real estate brokers to deliver payments for referrals of mortgage business. Some of the agreements had the brokers require anyone seeking to purchase a listed property to obtain prequalification with Prospect, even if they had already prequalified with another lender. Prospect and Planet Home Lending had an agreement under which Planet would identify and persuade consumers to refinance with Prospect, for which the two companies would split the proceeds of the sale of such loans.

On February 2, 2017, HomeBridge Financial Services completed the acquisition of the operating assets of Prospect Mortgage. Prospect Mortgage associates transitioned to HomeBridge.
