= Thévenoud Law =

Chauffeurs law in France

The Thévenoud Law (French: Loi Thévenoud) is a law by the Government of France that requires all chauffeurs to hold professional licenses, among other restrictions.

The law was introduced in October 2014 by its namesake, Thomas Thévenoud, the former foreign trade minister of France.

== See also ==
- Legality of TNCs by jurisdiction
