= SoFi =

American financial services company

SoFi Technologies, Inc.
- Type: Public
- Traded as: Nasdaq: SOFI; Russell 1000 component
- ISIN: US83406F1021
- Industry: Personal finance; Direct banking; Banking as a service
- Founded: August 2011; 15 years ago
- Founders: List of founders: Mike Cagney; Dan Macklin; James Finnigan; Ian Brady
- Headquarters: San Francisco, California, U.S.
- Area served: 30 countries: U.S.; Latin America; Hong Kong; India; The Philippines; Parts of Europe
- Key people: Anthony Noto (CEO); Chris Lapointe (CFO)
- Products: List of products: SoFi Checking & Savings; SoFiUSD (stablecoin); SoFi Invest; SoFi Crypto; SoFi Protect (Insurance); Estate planning; Personal loans; Home loans; Student loans; SoFi Credit card; SoFi Relay (Dashboard); SoFi Plus (Subscription); Cash Coach (AI-insights); SoFi At Work (Workplace benefits); Small Business Loans; Big Business Banking; Galileo (Banking software)
- Services: List of services: Online lending; Mobile & online banking; Loan origination; Stockbroking; Cryptocurrency trading; Insurance broking; Wealth management; Banking as a service
- Revenue: ▲US$3.61 billion (2025)
- Net income: ▼US$481 million (2025)
- Total assets: ▲US$50.66 billion (2025)
- Total equity: ▲US$10.49 billion (2025)
- Members: ▲17.1mn customers; ▼135mn platform accounts; (2026)
- Number of employees: ▲ c. 6,100 (2025)
- Divisions: Lending; Financial services; Technology platform
- Subsidiaries: List of subsidiaries: Galileo Fin. Tech. LLC; Social Finance Inc.; SoFi Bank N.A.; SoFi Lending Corp.
- Website: sofi.com

SoFi Technologies, Inc. (abbreviated as SoFi, short for Social Finance) is an American financial technology company. Founded in 2011 by Stanford University graduates as a student loan refinancier, it operates a direct bank serving retail customers and businesses. SoFi is the largest U.S.-based online lender, and has over 17 million customers as of 2026.

In its initial years, SoFi focused on providing student loans, using data science to assess risk and offer lower interest rates. It later expanded to personal loans, mortgages, auto loans, credit cards, stock investing, insurance, estate planning, and bank accounts. SoFi was the first fintech startup company to receive a U.S. banking license, and the first U.S. national bank to offer cryptocurrency trading and issue its own stablecoin on a public blockchain.

== History ==
=== 2011–2013: Founding and early years ===
SoFi was founded by Mike Cagney, Dan Macklin, James Finnigan, and Ian Brady, four graduate students who met at the Stanford Graduate School of Business in the Fall of 2011. The firm began with a pilot program offering low-interest student loans to Stanford University students, for which 40 alumni loaned an average of roughly $20,000 to each of about 100 students.

In September 2012, SoFi raised $77.2 million, led by Baseline Ventures, with participation from DCM and Renren. Additional investors included Ron Suber.

On October 2, 2013, SoFi announced that it had raised $500 million in debt and equity to fund and refinance student loans. This total funding amount came from $90 million in equity, $151 million in debt, and $200 million in bank participations, with the remaining capital from alumni and community investors. The $151 million in debt includes a $60 million line of credit from Morgan Stanley, and a $41 million line of credit from U.S. Bancorp.

As of September 2013, SoFi had funded $200 million in loans to 2500 borrowers at the company's 100 eligible schools.

In November 2013, SoFi announced a deal with Barclays and Morgan Stanley to create a bond backed by peer-to-peer student loans, which would create the first securitization of these loans to receive a credit rating.

=== 2014–2018: Expansion, challenges, FTC charges ===
In April 2014, SoFi raised $80 million in a Series C round led by Discovery Capital Management with participation from Peter Thiel, Wicklow Capital, and existing investors. Money was raised to expand the footprint of the company's student loan refinancing business and to extend into new products like mortgages and personal loans.

In February 2015, the company announced a $200 million funding round led by Third Point Management. That same month, the company officially began offering personal loans. By March 2015, the company was offering mortgages in more than 20 states, up from its initial launch that included under ten states in October 2014. By next month, the company had funded more than $2 billion in loans, including student loan refinancing, mortgages, personal loans, and MBA loans. To celebrate its $2 billion milestone, SoFi announced a contest, #2BillionTogether, to pay off one of its members student loans. In September 2015, former SEC Chairman Arthur Levitt was added as an advisor. The firm also raised a $1 billion round of investment from SoftBank and said it had funded $4 billion in loans.

In May 2016, SoFi became the first startup online lender to receive a triple-A rating from Moody's. In September 2016, SoFi launched SoFi at Work, an employee benefit program to reduce student debt and build financial wellness, and announced it has more than 600 corporate partners. As of October 2016, SoFi funded more than $12 billion in total loan volume and had 175,000 members. In February 2017, it was announced that SoFi raised an additional $500 million from an investor group led by Silver Lake, and also including SoftBank, to help support global expansion. In May 2017, Reuters reported that SoFi had launched a new online wealth management service, and referenced the company as "one of the largest online lenders" in the U.S.

==== CEO sexual harassment claims ====
On September 11, 2017, CEO Mike Cagney announced he would resign by the end of year due to allegations of sexual harassment and skirting risk and compliance controls. Announced January 23, 2018, Anthony Noto resigned from his position as COO of Twitter, to become the CEO of SoFi. In April 2018, SoFi announced that Michelle Gill, who previously worked at TPG and Goldman Sachs, would join the company as Chief Financial Officer.

==== False claims and FTC charges ====
In October 2018, SoFi settled Federal Trade Commission (FTC) charges, agreeing to stop making false claims about savings from student loan refinancing. The FTC alleged that SoFi had been making such false claims since April 2016. In February 2019, the FTC announced its approval of the final consent order under which SoFi is prohibited from misrepresenting to consumers how much money consumers will save or have saved using its products and from making any claims about any such savings unless the claims are backed up with reliable evidence. The order expires on February 22, 2039, or 20 years from the Commission's most recent date of filing a complaint in federal court reporting any misconduct that occurs later.

=== 2019–2023: Going public, national banking license ===
In May 2019, SoFi closed $500 million within one funding round led by Qatar Investment Authority. In September 2019, SoFi signed a 20-year deal with the Los Angeles Rams and the Los Angeles Chargers of the National Football League (NFL) for the naming rights to SoFi Stadium in Inglewood, California. The deal, which is worth $30 million annually, is a record for any naming rights for a sports venue. In April 2020, SoFi acquired Salt Lake City-based financial services API and payments platform "Galileo" for $1.2 billion in stock and cash, and Hong Kong–based investment app "8 Securities". SoFi went public through a merger with a special-purpose acquisition company (SPAC) backed by Chamath Palihapitiya raising up to $2.4 billion at a $9 billion valuation. It began trading on the Nasdaq under the ticker symbol SOFI on June 1, 2021.

In January 2022, SoFi received approval from the Office of the Comptroller of the Currency (OCC) for a national bank charter. The company was the first full-service financial-technology startup to receive a U.S. banking license. In February 2022, SoFi purchased Golden Pacific Bancorp, owner of Sacramento, California based Golden Pacific Bank, for $22.3 million. This allowed SoFi to hold loans for investment as opposed to selling them to outside investors, and allowed it to obtain the bank charter from the OCC. In March, SoFi acquired Technisys, a cloud-based banking system, for $1.1 billion.

In 2023, SoFi was named as one of the World's Most Innovative Companies by Fast Company in March and one of the World's Top Fintech Companies by CNBC in August. In January, the company was quoted to claim nearly 6% market share in the U.S. personal loans business. Later, by March, it had reached over $10B in total deposits. The same month, SoFi sued the Biden administration to block the pause on student loan repayment, saying it was hurting its business. SoFi dropped the lawsuit three months later, after a debt ceiling deal had been signed into law which provided a clear timeline for the resumption of student loan repayments. In April 2023, the company announced it had acquired Wyndham Capital Mortgage in an all-cash deal. According to American Banker in July 2023, SoFi had an estimated 60% share in the U.S. student loan refinancing market. By December 2023, the company reportedly had a 9.5% market share in "unsecured lending within a specific credit box" and a 0.1% share in the home loan market in the U.S.

=== 2024–2025: Growth, diversification ===
In April 2024, a CNN study recognized SoFi as the "best student loan refinance lender". The study highlighted SoFi's competitive rates, flexible terms, and various perks. However, it also noted areas for improvement, specifically in disclosing the minimum credit score requirement and offering a cosigner release option for refinance loans. During the same month, another study cited SoFi's auto repair loans as the "best for customer benefits," while also noting some downsides, including a high credit score requirement, a minimum loan amount of over $5,000, lack of disclosure on the minimum income requirement, and limited nationwide availability.

In May 2024, SoFi was fined $1,100,000 for creating a cash management brokerage account system for which they failed to set up proper safeguards to prevent withdrawals made using stolen or fake identities. Around 800 of these accounts transferred some $8.6 million from other customers' accounts. That same month, CNN cited SoFi as the "best online personal loan" provider. The company was said to offer "competitive rates" and "free access to professional financial advisors who do not sell products".

In August 2024, both CBS News and USA Today ranked SoFi as the "best overall" provider of personal loans. Separately, SoFi's personal loans were cited as the "best for long repayment terms" and were noted for offering repayment periods up to 84 months and loan amounts up to $100,000. The personal loans were also recognized as the "best for refinancing high-interest debt".

In October 2024, SoFi's Form 8-K for July–September 2024, filed with the U.S. Securities and Exchange Commission, stated that the number of SoFi customers was nearly 9.4 million, and that the company's "technology platform enabled accounts" numbered 160 million. For the year ended December 31, 2024, the company announced the figures of $2.67 billion in revenue and $498.67 million in net income, and said that it had nearly 5,000 employees, $36.25 billion in total assets and $6.53 billion in total equity. It also stated that its technology platform enabled accounts and total members (customers) reached 168 million and exceeded 10.1 million, respectively.

In April 2025, SoFi stated that 41% of its annualized revenues were fee-based, including the fees from the company’s loan platform business, interchange services, loan referrals, as well as fees earned from its insurance business and small and medium business offerings. SoFi also reported as having nearly 11.7 million customers and 160 million technology platform enabled accounts, and claimed to be the only facilitator of digital person-to-person payments using phone numbers or email addresses. In June 2025, the company announced a reintroduction of its cryptocurrency and blockchain-related offerings, which it originally offered until December 2023, in response to the 2025 regulation changes under the GENIUS Act. In October 2025, SoFi announced the introduction of a new product called Cash Coach — an AI-powered system designed to assist consumers in optimizing the interest earned in deposit accounts and minimizing the interest expense on credit cards. The company also reported an increased customer count of 12.6 million by this time.

In November 2025, SoFi became the first nationally chartered consumer bank in the U.S. to allow members to buy, sell and hold cryptocurrencies directly within its banking app. In December 2025, the company launched a stablecoin, called SoFiUSD, and became the first U.S. national bank to launch a stablecoin on the public blockchain. For the year ending on December 31, 2025, SoFi reported $3.61 billion in revenue, $481 million in net income, $50.66 billion in total assets and $10.49 billion in total equity. The member accounts, technology platform enabled accounts and the number of employees were 13.7 million, 128 million, and 6,100 respectively. The company also said its international payments product, SoFi Pay, was active in more than 30 countries, including parts of Europe, Brazil, India, Mexico and the Philippines.

=== 2026–present: Acquisitions, Business banking ===
In March 2026, SoFi and Mastercard announced a partnership to allow SoFiUSD as a settlement option in Mastercard’s worldwide payment network. The integration would allow Mastercard customers to transfer funds quickly in certain situations, such as cross-border remittances and business-to-business money transfers. In April 2026, SoFi announced the debut of its Big Business Banking tool, designed to let businesses manage fiat and cryptocurrency banking, hold deposits, move funds and settle transactions on the company's banking platform. In May 2026, the company announced it was rolling out its stablecoin product to all of its retail banking customers, which numbered 14.7 million by this time. That same month, SoFi announced the acquisitions of PrimaryBid, a U.K. based fintech company that enabled retail investors to participate in public market offerings by aggregating orders into a single block, and Peach Finance, a U.S.-based startup specializing in loan servicing software.

In June 2026, SoFi began offering small-business loans between $2,500 and $250,000. It said these loans did not require origination fees and did not charge prepayment penalties. In the same month, the company also acquired Composer, a Canada-based startup which allowed retail investors to create and execute complex trading strategies. Later in 2026, SoFi reported it had 17.1 million retail customers and 135 million technology platform-enabled accounts.

== Business model ==
SoFi originally used an alumni-funded lending model that connected students and recent graduates with alumni and institutional investors via school-specific student loan funds. Investors received a financial return and borrowers received rates lower than the U.S. Department of Education offered. The company sought to minimize defaults by focusing on students and graduates determined to be low-risk.

As SoFi's offerings expanded to include mortgages, mortgage refinancing, personal loans, auto loans, credit cards, stock investing, insurance, estate planning, and bank accounts, the company placed focus on digital banking methods, without operating physical branches. As of 2024, it comprises three divisions: lending, technology platform, and financial services. The lending division, SoFi's largest source of revenue as of 2023, generates income from net interest, securitization sales, and whole loan sales. The technology platform division generates income via Galileo's customer services, including platform access and card management services, offered in form of APIs. The financial services division generates income from transaction and management fees, share lending, and other sources. A part of SoFi's revenue comes of its "loan platform business" which refers pre-qualified borrowers to lending partners or originates loans on behalf of third parties.

== Products ==
SoFi operates as an online consumer bank. It also has a loan platform business, which refers prequalified borrowers to loan origination partners and originates loans on behalf of third parties. SoFi has been reported as the largest online lender and student loan refinancier in the U.S. The company also provides its technology platform to other financial institutions.

=== Lending ===
Personal loans, student loans, home loans, and loan refinancing are all part of SoFi's lending services. In 2015, SoFi had over $6 billion in loans issued, becoming one of the largest marketplace lenders. They maintain a policy of no fees for their loans, aside from the interest.

=== SoFi Invest ===
SoFi Invest is an investing platform.

In 2018, SoFi introduced commission and fee-free trades of stocks and exchange-traded funds under the name SoFi Invest (formerly SoFi Wealth). This service is now called SoFi Active investing. The company also offers Options Level 1 and 2 services as part of its investing offering.

As of December 2023, SoFi's assets for the fiscal year totaled $27.98 billion. Services offered also include traditional IRA, Roth IRA, and SEP IRA retirement accounts.

=== SoFi Crypto ===
In February 2019, SoFi launched a partnership with Coinbase to offer trading of Bitcoin, Ethereum, Litecoin, and more than 17 other crypto assets to users in most of the United States. Cryptocurrency transactions were one of SoFi's only products that had fees. SoFi shuttered its cryptocurrency services in December 2023, as part of a requirement to receive a banking charter from the U.S. Office of the Comptroller of the Currency.

In June 2025, SoFi announced a plan to reintroduce its cryptocurrency and blockchain-related offerings, in response to the 2025 regulation changes under the GENIUS Act. In November 2025, SoFi Crypto was launched, making SoFi the first nationally chartered consumer bank in the U.S. to allow the holding and exchange of cryptocurrencies in-app.

=== SoFi Checking and Savings, SoFi Credit Card ===
The SoFi Checking account is bundled with the SoFi Savings account. The accounts have no fees and are backed by the FDIC. Their cash management (checking) accounts and investment platform include brokerage and robo-advisor services. In July 2020, SoFi launched a partnership with Samsung Pay to launch Samsung Money by SoFi, a cash management checking/savings accounts, with a digital and physical debit card. In late 2020, SoFi launched its first-ever credit card. In 2022, SoFi launched SoFi Money under SoFi Bank, a checking and savings account. The previous cash management account was deprecated to pay zero percent interest, which caused controversy.

The SoFi Credit Card is a cash-back credit card. It has a rewards program where the value of the points earned are higher when redeemed toward SoFi banking, loan and investment products.

=== SoFi Relay, Cash Coach ===
SoFi Relay, a credit score monitoring and budgeting tool, is available to anyone who registers a free SoFi account. The service allows users to track their money in bank, credit card, investment, and loan balances and transactions as well as set financial goals. No-cost credit score tracking with weekly updates is provided through TransUnion. In August 2023, SoFi began integrating Galileo Financial Technologies' conversational AI engine into its personal finance application. The company also offers Cash Coach, an AI-powered tool designed to assist consumers in optimizing the interest earned in deposit accounts and minimizing the interest expense on credit cards.

=== SoFi Protect ===
SoFi Protect is an insurance product. It is part of SoFi's suite of financial products and services, which include credit cards, loans, and investment options. SoFi has partnered with several third party insurance companies, such as Lemonade, Inc., in order to offer life insurance, auto insurance, homeowners insurance, and renters insurance.

=== SoFi Pay ===
SoFi Pay is an international money movement product based on blockchain technology. The product was launched in October 2025. It was active in more than 30 countries, including parts of Europe, Brazil, India, Mexico and the Philippines by the end of 2025, according to SoFi.

=== SoFiUSD ===
SoFiUSD, launched in December 2025, is a stablecoin issued on a public blockchain; it is the first stablecoin issued by a U.S. national bank. In May 2026, the company began offering SoFiUSD to all of its customers, available directly through its banking app. The company also provides the underlying infrastructure to banks and fintechs that can white-label the stablecoin, with all such tokens being interchangeable at par with SoFiUSD.

=== Galileo ===
SoFi's Galileo platform is a fintech service that helps companies offer banking features like digital payments, card issuing, and account management without building their own systems. The platform provides digital banking software to multiple banks and fintech brands in the U.S. and Latin America. SoFi also provides API access to its technology platform, supporting banks in processing credit card payments and helping businesses launch financial services.

== See also ==
- List of largest banks in the United States
