= Homebridge Financial Services =

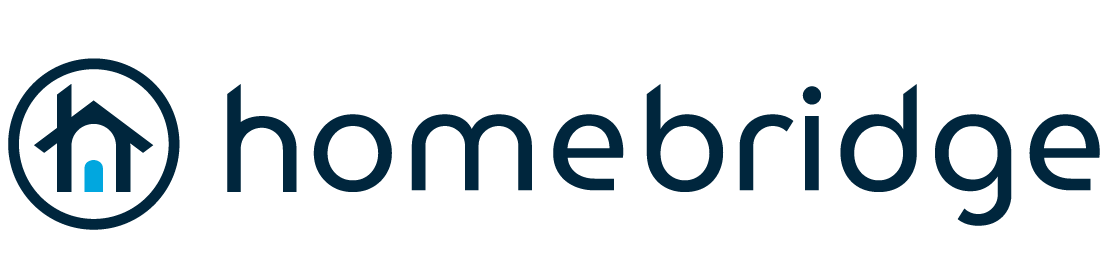
- Type: Private
- Industry: Mortgage lending
- Founded: 1989; 37 years ago (as REMN)
- Headquarters: Iselin, NJ, U.S.
- Area served: United States
- Key people: Peter Norden (CEO); Joel Katz (President); Joe Sheriden (COO)
- Products: 15- and 30-Year Fixed-Rate Mortgages; FHA Loans; VA Loans; ARM Loans; Jumbo Loans
- Parent: HomeBridge Financial Services, Inc.
- Website: www.homebridge.com

Homebridge Financial Services, Inc. (previously known as Real Estate Mortgage Network), is a privately held, non-bank loan company based in the United States. The company currently comprises approximately 3,000 associates and over 250 retail branches. The company also includes two separate wholesale loan operations, HomeBridge Wholesale (headquartered in Irvine, California), and REMN Wholesale (headquartered in Iselin, New Jersey). HomeBridge holds FNMA, GNMA, FHLMC, FHA and VA approvals, and maintains relationships with 49 investors of other non-agency products.

== History ==
In 2012, Peter Norden became CEO of Real Estate Mortgage Network (REMN). On February 1, 2014, REMN changed its name to HomeBridge Financial Services. The company had four divisions: Homebridge Retail (its B2C retail lending division), Homebridge Wholesale (a B2B wholesale lending division), REMN Wholesale (a B2B wholesale lending division) and HomeBridge Funding (its B2B correspondent lending division). In mid-2015 HomeBridge Funding was acquired by Planet Home Lending, LLC.

In 2014, Homebridge funded $6.36 billion in home mortgage loans, and nearly $12 billion in its servicing portfolio. The company increased its funded home loans 36% in 2015 to $8.7 billion. Also in 2014, the company was ranked number ten on Mortgage Executive magazine's list of the "Top 100 Mortgage Companies in America". HomeBridge announced its acquisition of the operating assets of Prospect Mortgage on November 1, 2016. The company's current CEO is Peter Norden (a residential mortgage business entrepreneur). The company's president is Joel Katz.

In August 2021, Homebridge agreed to merge with fin-tech startup Figure Technologies, which provides financial services using blockchain technology; However, this merger was cancelled on June 6, 2022 citing "regulatory delays" as being chiefly responsible.

CMG Mortgage acquired the retail division of Homebridge Financial Services on April 1, 2023.
