= DCM Ventures =

Venture capital firm

- Type: Private company
- Industry: Venture Capital
- Founded: 1996; 30 years ago
- Founders: Dixon Doll and David Chao
- Headquarters: Menlo Park, California
- AUM: $4.5 billion
- Website: www.dcm.com

DCM Ventures (commonly DCM, formerly Doll Capital Management) is an American venture capital firm headquartered in Menlo Park, California specializing in early-stage investments in private technology companies. The firm is regarded as one of the first American venture capital firms to invest in early-stage technology companies in Japan, China, South Korea, Southeast Asia, and other emerging markets, starting in 1999. As of 2025, the firm has approximately US$4.5 billion in assets under management.

Notable successful investments made by the firm include SoFi, Bill.com, Matterport, Kuaishou, Hims & Hers Health, Careem, TikTok (by way of Musical.ly), and Vipshop.

== History ==
DCM was founded in 1996 by former Accel partner Dixon Doll, who launched the venture industry’s first telecom-focused fund while at Accel, and Japanese entrepreneur and executive David Chao, with an initial focus on early-stage investments in semiconductors and communications technology.

As internet penetration accelerated across emerging markets, DCM expanded its global operations and broadened its investment focus. The firm's expansion into Asia was led by Taiwanese-American Hurst Lin, co-founder and COO of Sina Corporation, one of China’s leading internet companies. Over time, the firm’s investment scope grew to include consumer internet and mobile platforms, e-commerce, enterprise software, financial technology, and AI-native applications.

DCM is known for its highly concentrated investment strategy, making only a select number of new investments each year.

The firm primarily invests in companies based in the United States, with additional activity in Japan, China, and South Korea, as well as selective investments in Latin America, the Middle East, and Europe.

== Investments ==
Over its 30-year history, DCM has invested in 400+ technology companies, backing 35+ unicorns and generating over $200 billion in enterprise value. Notable outcomes include turning a $26.4M investment in Bill.com into nearly $1B, with a 33% stake at IPO, and a $50M investment in Kuaishou that grew to $12.5B at IPO, representing a return of over 2,000x.

DCM's portfolio includes a diverse range of companies across geographies and sectors. Some include:

- Bill.com: Fintech platform automating financial operations for 400K+ U.S. businesses.
- Figure Lending: America's largest non-bank HELOC provider, using blockchain to deliver faster, more efficient home loans.
- Hims: Telehealth company delivering care across primary health, mental wellness, and personal care.
- Modern Animal: Veterinary clinics offering modern, tech-enabled pet care.
- Cherry: Buy-now-pay-later financing platform for elective healthcare procedures.
- SoFi: Consumer finance platform offering loans, banking, and investing services.
- Assured Claims: Builds digital infrastructure to modernize insurance claims processing.
- TikTok (via Musical.ly): Global short-form video leader, backed by DCM’s early backing of Musical.ly.
- Kuaishou: One of China’s largest video platforms with 600M+ users.
- Akulaku: One of Southeast Asia’s top digital banking and consumer credit platforms.
- Musely: Online dermatology platform offering prescription skincare through licensed providers.
- Matterport: Leading 3D spatial data platform transforming physical spaces into immersive digital twins.
- Moove: Embedded fintech platform providing vehicle financing to mobility workers across emerging markets.
- Skylo: A satellite network providing IoT connectivity in remote and rural areas.
- YQN: A leading digital logistics and fulfillment platform in Asia.
- Kakao: Leading South Korean tech platform offering messaging, media, and payments.
- Careem: Ride-hailing and delivery platform acquired by Uber to anchor its Middle East expansion.
- Jackpocket: Mobile lottery app digitizing ticket purchases in a $100B+ U.S. market.
- Picsart: One of the world’s largest creative platforms for mobile photo and video editing.

== Fund Track Record ==
In 2021, Business Insider revealed that DCM's 2014 flagship fund is set to generate $10 billion and a 30x return multiple, making it one of the top performing venture funds in recent history.

In 2020, DCM raised $880 million for its global family of investment funds. The committed capital includes $780 million for DCM IX, its largest global fund to date, and $100 million for its third A-fund dedicated to global early-stage investments. Since its last fund, DCM has had 17 liquidity events, including Careem (acquired by Uber), Pony.ai, Wrike and Musical.ly (now TikTok).

In 2016, DCM raised $770 million for its investment funds. The firm runs a flagship fund for early-stage companies, a growth-stage investment fund (its Turbo Fund), and the A-Fund, an Android-focused VC fund that targets mobile and emerging platforms from early stage companies. In total, it has about $3.5 billion under management. Between 2013 and 2016, DCM returned $1.5 billion to its investors in profit upon exits from various investments previously under management.
