= Unison Home Ownership Investors =

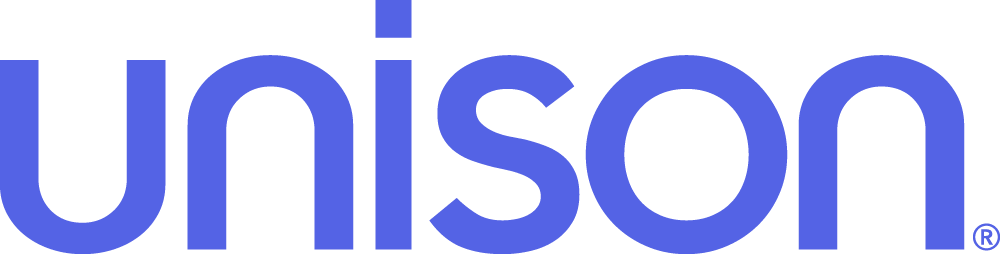
- Industry: Real estate
- Founded: 2004; 22 years ago
- Founder: Thomas Sponholtz Chairman and Chief Executive Officer
- Headquarters: San Francisco, California, United States
- Area served: United States
- Key people: Chief Executive Officer - Thomas Sponholtz Chief Financial Officer - Scott Case
- Website: www.unison.com

Unison Home Ownership Investors (commonly known as Unison) is an American financial services company that offers shared-equity home financing. Founded in 2004 as FirstREX and based in San Francisco, the company provides funds to homebuyers and homeowners in exchange for a share of changes in the value of a property.

== History ==
Thomas Sponholtz founded the company as FirstREX in 2004, but the company did not start becoming involved in home ownership investment until 2007. Sponholtz became the company's chief executive.

Sponholtz founded Unison as a way to connect institutional investors to local real estate agents and home buyers who didn't have the capital required to purchase a home and didn't want to take out loans, make monthly payments, or incur debt. Jim Riccitelli joined Unison as co-CEO several years later and served as head of the company's customer education program. From 2017 to 2019, Riccitelli assumed the role of president, and would focus on consumer education and financial literacy.

In 2013, the company announced it would provide down payment funding in combination with the portfolio loans of HomeStreet Bank and with RPM Mortgage loans in California.

In 2016, it launched its down payment funding in combination with Guild Mortgage loans in Washington and they expanded the availability to consumers in Oregon and California. That same year the company announced it would offer its down payment funding with California Mortgage Company (First Cal) on single-family homes, condos and townhomes in combination with conventional loans meeting conforming and super-conforming guidelines.

On December 5, 2016, FirstREX changed its name to Unison Home Ownership Investors.

On February 21, 2017, then Prosper Marketplace President Ron Suber joined the company as an investor and strategic advisor. The company also raised 300 million in total capital. The company announced findings from the "Unison Home Affordability Report 2017," showcasing the percentage of homes accessible to the median household in major U.S. cities. Later that year, the company announced multiple promotions and additions to its management team.

In 2018, the company and Valley National Bank, the wholly owned subsidiary of Valley National Bancorp, announced the launch of their 5% down payment program which will be given in conjunction with an 80% loan-to-value mortgage. The New York Times wrote an article about shared equity programs that called attention to Unison, Landed, and Own Home Finance.

On June 26, 2018, Unison closed a $40 Million Series B Funding Round.

== Model ==
The Down Payment Resource House Price Index tracks 33 shared equity programs. Most are city/county, non-profit or university administered programs. There are also programs in high cost markets, like the San Francisco Bay area, designed by private investors to help buyers finance homes that are outside conventional home price limits.

The Urban Institute evaluated shared equity programs and found they are successful in linking low- and moderate-income people with affordable owner-occupied housing. In addition, home ownership among shared equity programs is sustainable, and shared equity homeowners resell their homes with the same frequency and for the same reasons as other homeowners.

The company's basic business model differs from the traditional financing in that the consumer does not incur debt because there is no monthly payment or interest accrued. Rather, a home ownership investment is a shared piece of capital between the investor and the homeowner. Under the arrangement, an investor provides funds in exchange for a contractual share of changes in the property's value. In a home ownership investment, an investor provides financing in exchange for the opportunity to share in the gain or loss in the home's value when the homeowner decides to sell their home. There are no interest charges or monthly payments on the financing provided.

The company operates two programs, Unison HomeBuyer and Unison HomeOwner.

The first, HomeBuyer, works in combination with a traditional mortgage, providing 5% to 15% of a 20% down payment, while the HomeOwner program is geared toward current homeowners looking to tap into their home equity. Both programs remain interest-free without monthly payments for 30 years.

The company, in return, shares 35 percent of the appreciation in the home either when it is sold, after 30 years, or when the borrower decides to pay back the investment. Conversely, if the home depreciates, the company shares in 35 percent of the loss. There is a minimum of 3 years required in order to realize the property appreciation.

The company has marketed its shared-equity products to homebuyers and homeowners seeking alternatives to conventional borrowing, such as baby boomers with inadequate savings, college graduates with outstanding student loan debt, and first time home buyers.

In 2017 the average homebuyer under 35 spent 8% on a down payment. the company's business model involves splitting a 20% down payment with homebuyers.

Unison has relationships with Guaranteed Rate, HomeBridge Financial Services, Guild Mortgage, Valley Bank, Goldwater Bank, HomeStreet Bank, PRMG, Supreme Lending, LendUS and others.

Unison programs are available in 30 states including Arizona, California, Connecticut, Oregon, Washington, Illinois, Massachusetts, Maryland, New Jersey, New York, Pennsylvania, Virginia, Florida, Georgia, Ohio, Michigan, Minnesota, Nevada, Colorado, North Carolina, Missouri, Delaware, Indiana, Kansas, Kentucky, New Mexico, South Carolina, Tennessee, Utah, Wisconsin and Washington, DC.
