= Mike Cagney =

American entrepreneur

Michael Cagney
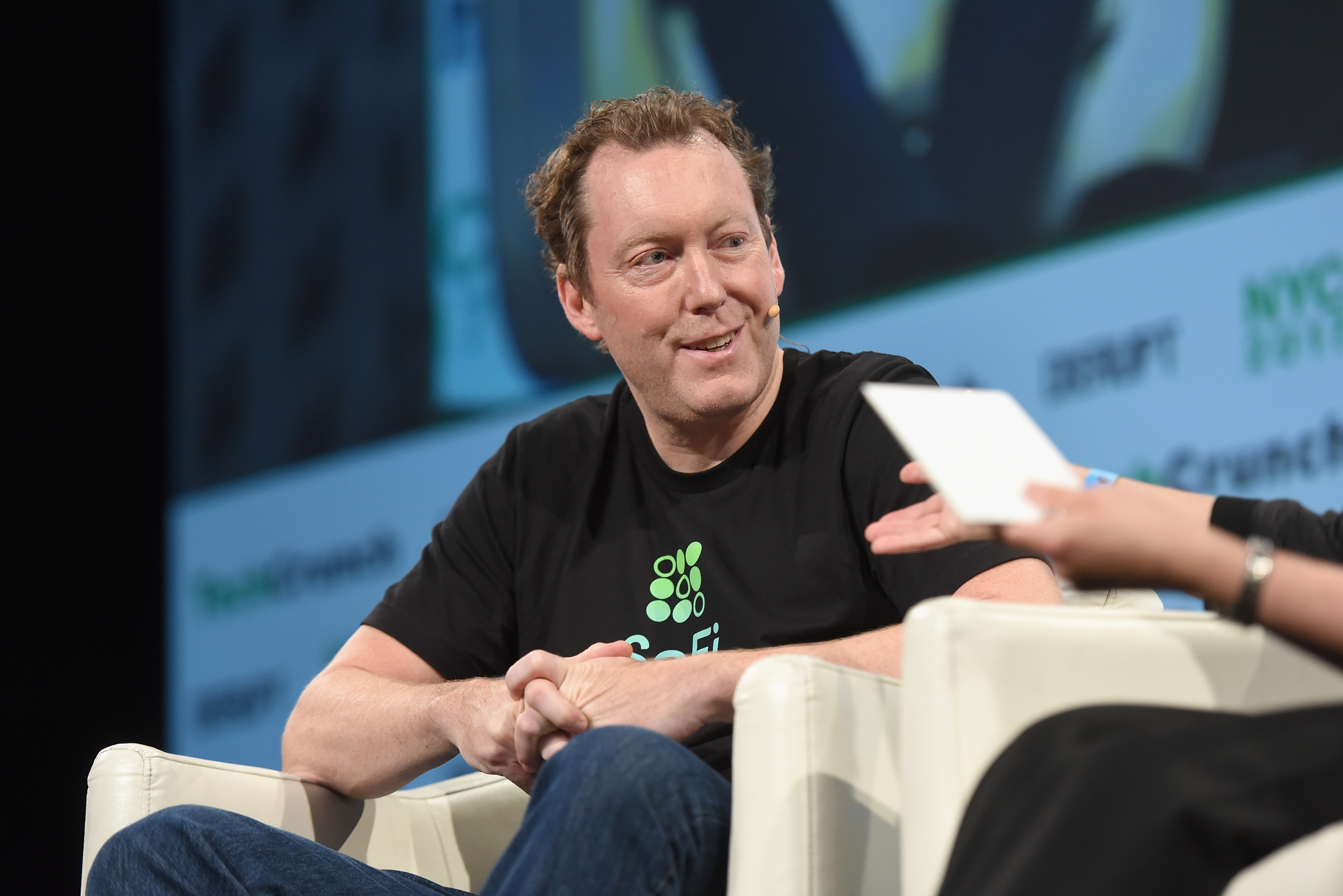
- Cagney in 2017
- Born: February 1, 1971 (age 55); Trenton, New Jersey, U.S.
- Education: University of California, Santa Cruz; Stanford Graduate School of Business
- Occupation: Entrepreneur
- Known for: Figure Technology Solutions, co-founder and CEO (2018–present); SoFi, Co-founder and CEO (2011–2017)
- Spouse: June Ou
- Children: 2
- Website: www.mikecagney.com

Michael Cagney (born February 1, 1971) is an American entrepreneur. He is the co-founder and CEO of financial services company Figure Technology Solutions, a member of the founding team of Provenance Blockchain, and the co-founder and former CEO of SoFi. Cagney is also co-founder and was the managing member of hedge fund Cabezon Investment Group.

== Career ==
Cagney was born in Trenton, New Jersey, and grew up in Philadelphia, Detroit, and Southern California. He received a degree in applied economics from the University of California, Santa Cruz. In 1994, Cagney worked as a trader with Wells Fargo before leaving in 2000 to start Finaplex, a wealth management software company that was acquired by Broadridge Financial Solutions. He then founded Cabezon Investment Group, a global macro hedge fund that manages money from family offices, before taking a Sloan Fellowship at Stanford University’s Graduate School of Business in 2010.

In 2011, Cagney and four fellow graduate students at the Stanford Graduate School of Business created SoFi as a way to lower loan costs while providing a way for alumni to invest in students. Stanford ran a pilot SoFi program, seeded with $2 million from 40 alumni and disbursed to 100 graduate business students. By 2013, the company had funded $200 million in loans to 2,500 borrowers at 100 eligible schools. By 2015, the company was offering mortgages in more than 20 states and had funded more than $4 billion in loans.

In 2015, Cagney raised a private financing for SoFi of over $1 billion, led by Softbank. It was the largest private financing ever done to that point.

In 2016, Cagney was named to Business Insider's Creators list of top 100 business visionaries creating value for the world. By 2017, SoFi had a valuation of over $4 billion and had extended more than $20 billion in loans. The company had also expanded its services to include mortgages, personal loans, wealth management services and life insurance.

In September 2017, Cagney left SoFi after several workplace controversies, including allegations of misconduct and presiding over a toxic work environment. At the time of his resignation, Cagney said that the litigation and ensuing media coverage made his presence a distraction to the company’s mission.

In 2018, Cagney and his wife, June Ou, co-founded fin-tech startup Figure Technology Solutions, which builds marketplaces to trade and finance blockchain-native assets. Figure was the first company to put consumer loans on the blockchain. The company has raised over $400 million since its launch with a valuation of $3.2 billion in 2021. As of 2019, the company had raised over $225 million and was valued at $1.2 billion. By 2020, the company began offering securitizations backed by Home Equity Lines of Credit (HELOC), including the largest bond backed by a HELOC in over a decade. In August 2021, Figure Technology Solutions agreed to merge with Homebridge Financial Services, a mortgage lender. In June 2022, the merger was cancelled. In March 2024, Figure Technology Solutions spun off its lending division by establishing a new parent entity, Figure Technology Solutions (FTS). The company has funded over $16 billion in loans, reporting $340 million in revenue. In 2024, Cagney split Figure into two companies, Figure and Figure Markets. He became chairman of Figure and CEO of Figure Markets. Cagney raised $60 million for Figure Markets in a round led by Pantera and Faction with participation from Jump Crypto, Distributed Global, and other investors.

In 2025, the companies recombined, purportedly to go public. Cagney is executive chairman of the recombined company. In the same year, Figure Markets went effective with the SEC as the first public security, a fixed-income stablecoin called $YLDS. Figure Markets also launched a DeFi lending protocol called Democratized Prime in 2025, directly connecting lenders and borrowers. In September 2025, Figure went public on Nasdaq under the ticker FIGR. The company is valued at $7.6 billion.

Cagney and Ou also founded Provenance Blockchain, a public proof-of-stake Layer 1 (L1) chain. In 2025, Provenance Blockchain was the largest public blockchain measured by real-world assets.

== Other activities ==
In 2024, Cagney was part of a group bidding to lift Celsius out of bankruptcy, but the bid was not successful. He later went on to support an activist campaign against the emerging public company, Ionic Digital. The campaign successfully claimed two board seats. Cagney also bid to rescue FTX from bankruptcy.

Cagney has written about his belief that stablecoins and the GENIUS Act will ultimately lead to narrow banking and support blockchain-based decentralized finance (DeFi).

== Personal life ==
Cagney is married, with two children.
