= Careem =

Dubai-based super-app

Careem Networks FZ-LLC
- Logo since 2023
- Type: Private
- Industry: Technology
- Founded: 2012; 14 years ago
- Founders: Mudassir Sheikha; Magnus Olsson; Abdulla Elyas
- Headquarters: Dubai, United Arab Emirates
- Area served: 70+ cities in the Middle East, Africa and Pakistan
- Key people: Mudassir Sheikha; Magnus Olsson; Abdulla Elyas
- Products: Mobile app
- Services: Ridesharing; Online food ordering; Digital wallets; Grocery delivery
- Parent: e& (50.03%); Uber
- Website: careem.com

Careem is a Dubai-based super-app with operations in over 70 cities in 10 countries in the Middle East, Africa, and South Asia. It offers ride-hailing, bicycle rental, food delivery, grocery delivery, and digital wallets. It is 50.03% owned by e&, while its ridesharing company is wholly owned by Uber.

== History ==
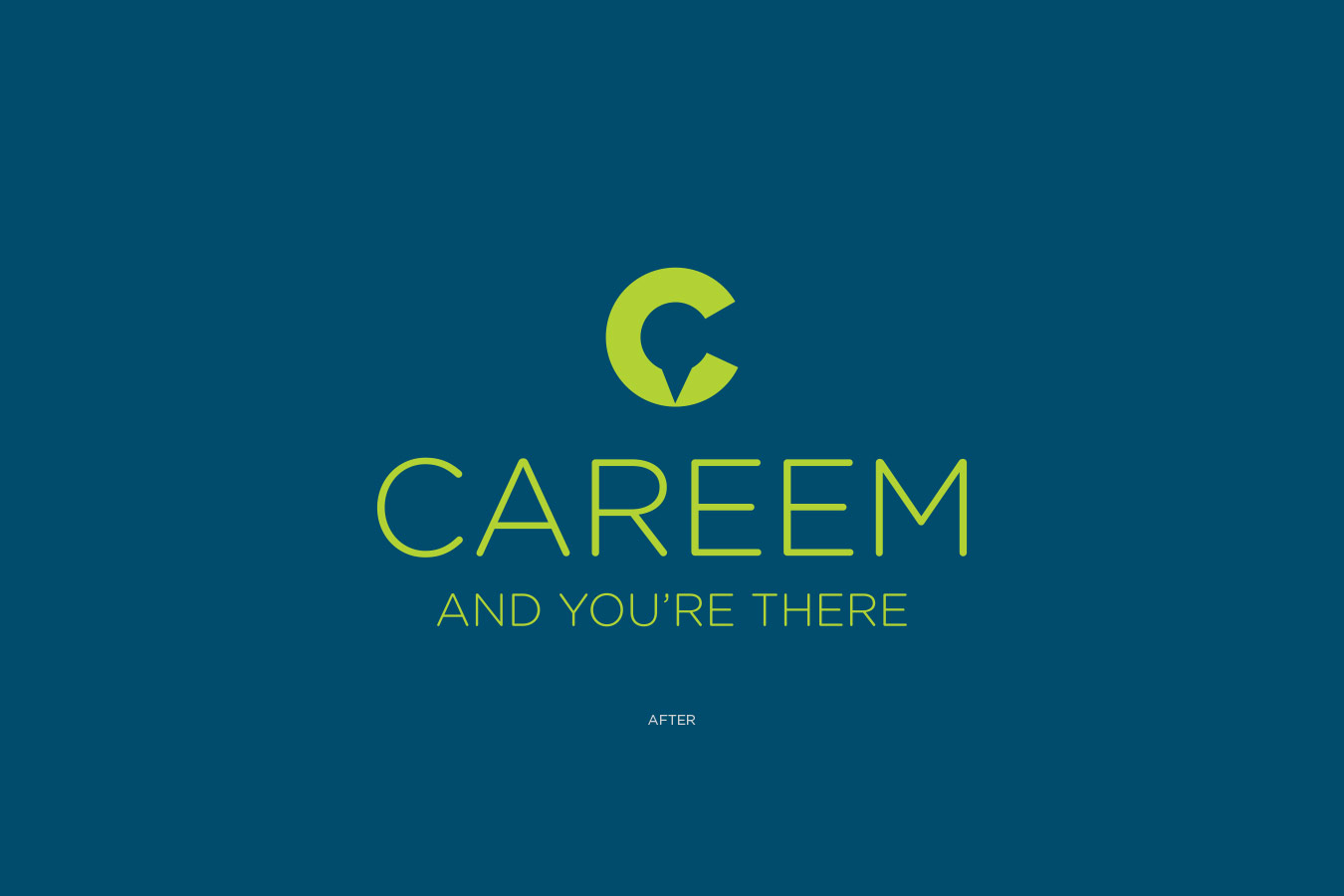
Careem's first logo, used from 2012 to 2016

Official logo used from 2016 to 2023

Careem was founded by Mudassir Sheikha, an American Memon of Pakistani origin, and Magnus Olsson of Sweden, who both worked as management consultants at McKinsey & Company. It began operations in 2012 as a website-based service for corporate car bookings, and evolved to become a ridesharing company.

Careem received seed money of US$1.7 million in a round led by STC Ventures in 2013. In 2014, it received funding of US$10 million in a Series B round led by Al Tayyar Travel Group and STC Ventures.

In January 2015, the company acquired enwani, operator of a Saudi-based delivery service, and Abdulla Elyas joined Careem as co-founder.

In November 2015, Careem announced a Series C round investment of US$60 million led by The Abraaj Group.

In February 2016, taxi drivers in Egypt organized several protests and sit-ins demanding that the Egyptian government block Uber and Careem from operating without official taxi licenses. The government then established rules to regulate Careem and Uber and provided legal protection for drivers.

In October 2016, the company was forced by regulators in Dubai to allow customers to book all taxicabs and limousines operating in Dubai via the Careem mobile app.

In December 2016, the company raised US$350 million in a Series D round, based on a US$1 billion valuation for the company. Saudi Telecom Company acquired a 10% stake in Careem.

In March 2017, the company announced a program to extend maternity leave and hire more women.

In May 2017, in Saudi Arabia, women made up 80% of the company's customers.

In June 2017, the company raised an additional $150 million in a Series E round at a $1 billion valuation. Investors included Kingdom Holding Company, Mercedes-Benz Group, as well as Lumia Capital, DCM Ventures and Coatue Management. Abraaj sold its stake in the company to Kingdom Holding Company.

Also in June 2017, Careem launched operations in Palestine as part of a commitment to create one million jobs in the MENA region by the end of 2018.

In August 2017, DiDi invested in Careem and entered a partnership to share knowledge in intelligent transportation technology, product development, and operations.

In January 2018, Careem became the first ride-hailing service to launch in Baghdad. The company also has locations in Najaf and Erbil, Kurdistan Region.

In January 2018, Careem started recruiting women in Saudi Arabia as part of the Women to drive movement. Women were legally allowed to start driving on 24 June 2018, and Careem women drivers were able to start working on the same day.

Also in January 2018, Careem discovered data on more than 14 million riders and 558,800 drivers were breached. The company waited until late April 2018 to disclose this breach as it "wanted to make sure we had the most accurate information before notifying people". According to investigations by the company, there was no initial evidence of fraud or misuse. Careem allegedly was notified about the vulnerability over a year earlier but did nothing.

In February 2018, Careem acquired RoundMenu, a restaurant listing and food ordering platform that operates across the Arab world.

Also in February 2018, the company raised $200 million at a valuation of US$2 billion.

In March 2018, Careem planned to have a female workforce of 20,000 by the year 2020. It already had women drivers in Pakistan, Egypt, and Jordan.

In August 2018, Careem announced the launch of bus services, starting with cities in Egypt in December 2018. The service was discontinued in early 2020.

In October 2018, the company secured US$200 million funding from its existing investors.

In November 2018, Careem launched an online food ordering and food delivery app called Careem Now, delivering food and pharmaceuticals, initially in Dubai and Jeddah.

In December 2018, Careem launched the ability to book buses in Egypt.

In May 2019, Careem announced the acquisition of UAE-based bicycle-sharing system startup Cyacle which was re-branded as Careem Bike. By 2023, Careem Bike had 192 docking stations across Dubai. Careem Bike launched 165 bicycle and scooter stations in Medina, with nearly 2,000 customers traveling almost 60,000 km in the city on bicycles in 2023.

In July 2019, Careem launched food delivery in Riyadh and Amman, and announced it was also launching in Pakistan.

Careem launched Careem Bike in partnership with the Roads & Transport Authority in 2020 to support the UAE's target to cut emissions by 40% by 2030.

In January 2020, the company was acquired by Uber for $3.1 billion, including US$1.4 billion in cash and US$1.7 billion in convertible notes, making Careem the first unicorn startup company in the Middle East outside of Israel. Careem continues to operate under its own brand. About 75 Careem employees became dollar millionaires.

In April 2020, Careem began delivering groceries and other essential products in Dubai.

In May 2020, due to the COVID-19 pandemic, Careem announced layoffs of 536 employees, 31% of its workforce.

Also in May 2020, Uber Eats exited the United Arab Emirates and transferred its services to Careem.

It launched Careem Quik, delivery service for groceries and household items, in December 2020.

In April 2022, Careem launched Careem Pay, a digital wallet for money transfers and withdrawals in the UAE. Careem introduced a remittance corridor between the UAE and Pakistan in partnership with Lulu Exchange and launched a one-click checkout for e-commerce websites and bill payment. In India, by December 2023, Careem Pay's remittance service had maintained a user retention rate of 77% with an average transaction time of 15 minutes.

In June 2022, Careem suspended food delivery service in Pakistan due to the Pakistan economic crisis.

In 2022, the Roads & Transport Authority announced that 2.8 million Careem Bike trips had been completed since its launch, reducing emissions by 1,926,033 kilograms, equivalent to emissions from 600 cars.

In February 2023, Careem ceased its operations in Qatar including ridesharing, grocery and food delivery, courier services, and digital payments without explanation.

In May 2023, Careem launched DineOut, a restaurant discount program.

In June 2023, founder Mudassir Sheikha received backlash after writing on LinkedIn that the company is not the right fit for those whose top priority is cash compensation, a 9-to-5 job, or those who thrive with structure and certainty. He emphasized that Careem is more focused on impact and fulfilling its purpose rather than offering high cash compensation or a structured work environment. His post was described as "tone-deaf" and "cringe." However, he was also praised for being "rare" and "honest" and Careem employees had high job satisfaction ratings in surveys.

In 2023, 53% of Careem's trips in the UAE were completed with hybrid or electric vehicles.

In 2023, Careem expanded its EV fleet in Jordan to form 45% of the fleet in Irbid.

In December 2023, Careem introduced rides with an "Eco-friendly" car type, often operating on electric or hybrid power, in partnership with CarbonSifr. The initiative, which also funds tree planting activities, offset more than 200 tonnes of CO2e in under 3 months and was expanded to Abu Dhabi in April 2024. The program was expanded to Saudi Arabia in January 2025.

In December 2023, e& acquired a majority stake in Careem's Super App business for a $400 million investment. Careem's ride-hailing business continues to be owned by Uber, while the Careem Super App is owned by e&, as well as Uber and all three of Careem's co-founders.

In August 2024, the company launched discounted packages for students.

In December 2023, a promotion was launched in collaboration with Mastercard, where for every Careem Pay wallet top-up transaction using a Mastercard debit card, Emirates Nature-WWF pledged to plant a mangrove in the UAE on behalf of the cardholder.

In 2024, Careem introduced allowed users in Karachi to set a price of their rides.

In 2024, Careem unveiled its plans to introduce Dubai's first fleet of electric motorbikes, powered by 4,000 watt lithium battery packs, and charging station infrastructure at 192 Careem Bike stations, with the goal of reducing the carbon footprint of delivery trips by up to 24 tonnes of C02 per day, and provide cost savings.

In February 2025, the company launched money transfer services to 18 additional European countries.

In May 2025, the company began offering delivery of 24-carat gold coins. It also began delivery of labubus.

In July 2025, Careem stopped offering ride-hailing services in Pakistan.
