= Security token offering =

Public offering of digital securities

A security token offering (STO) / tokenized IPO is a type of public offering in which tokenized digital securities, known as security tokens, are sold in security token exchanges. Tokens can be used to trade real financial assets such as equities and fixed income, and use a blockchain virtual ledger system to store and validate token transactions.

Due to tokens being classified as securities, STOs are more susceptible to regulation and thus represent a more secure investment alternative than ICOs, which have been subject to numerous fraudulent schemes. Furthermore, since ICOs are not held in traditional exchanges, they can be a less expensive funding source for small and medium-sized companies when compared to an IPO. An STO on a regulated stock exchange (referred to as a tokenized IPO) has the potential to deliver significant efficiencies and cost savings, however.

By the end of 2019, STOs had been used in multiple scenarios including the trading of Nasdaq-listed company stocks, the pre-IPO of World Chess, FIDE's official broadcasting platform, and the creation of Singapore Exchange's own STO market, backed by Japan's Tokai Tokyo Financial Holdings.

== Controversy regarding ICOs ==
Though sharing some core concepts with ICOs and IPOs, STOs are in fact different from both, standing as an intermediary model. Similarly to ICOs, STOs are offerings that are made by selling digital tokens to the general public in cryptocurrency exchanges such as Binance, Kraken, Binaryx and others. The main difference stands in the fact that ICO tokens are the offered cryptocurrency's actual coins, entirely digital, and classified as utilities. New ICO currencies can be generated ad infinitum, as might in some cases their tokens. Additionally, their value is almost entirely speculative and arises from the perceived utility value buyers expect them to provide. Security tokens, on the other hand, are actual securities, like bonds or stocks, tied to a real company.

In terms of legislation, some jurisdictions do treat STOs, ICOs, and other cryptocurrency-related operations under the same legislative umbrella. In general, though, STOs are placed under securities legislation (together with traditional IPOs), and ICOs under utilities, with the differentiation being made mostly on a case-by-case basis.

The main debate surrounding security tokens is, thus, the legal differentiation of what can be qualified as a utility instead of a security. Generally, legislation understands that if a passive financial return is expected from the investment, then it is classified as a security. This way, even if the offering company understands their tokens are merely a utility asset with no expected return investment, if it can be proven otherwise then the ICO becomes an unregulated STO, passive of legal punishment. Moreover, this assumption of utility has been abused by some STO offering companies to sell securities without regulatory compliance (maliciously labeled as ICOs).

This legal ambiguity has led to some ICO offerers being prosecuted by the SEC as a security offering part, though their tokens were announced as utilities. Such companies include messaging apps Kik and Telegram, the former being sued by the SEC for over $100 million and the latter delaying their offering plans after similar prosecution.

== Regulation ==
One of the main selling points of cryptocurrencies such as Bitcoin has been the decentralization aspect, by which no government can influence or control the currency. By extension, a cryptocurrency is not directly affected by a specific country's jurisdiction, sociopolitical environment, or economic events. Such a lack of regulation has led to the rising of large-scale crypto-related criminal activity, ranging from terrorist funding to tax evasion, most of which go untracked and unpunished. Similarly, ICO scams have been an increasingly troublesome matter, causing billions of dollars in losses and damaging the cryptocurrency market's value as a whole.

So far, STOs have been regulated and legalized in many countries where ICOs have not, due to fitting in many already pre-existing regulations regarding securities.

| Jurisdiction | Status | Comments |
|---|---|---|
| European Union | Regulated | Regulated by MiFID II. Newly issued security tokens must fulfill requirements of the Prospectus Directive. |
| Germany | Regulated | MiFID licenses are issued by BaFin. |
| United Kingdom | Regulated | Categorized by the FCA under the category of Specified Investments. |
| Switzerland | Regulated | Regulated by FINMA and subject to the same laws as traditional securities. |
| United States | Regulated | Security tokens are subject to the SEC under the same laws as traditional securities. |
| Canada | Regulated | Must obtain approval from the CSA. |
| Brazil | Regulated | STOs must be registered and approved by the CVM. |
| Australia | Regulated | Legal under the regulation of ASIC. Traditional and tokenized securities are treated differently. |
| Israel | Regulated | Must follow the legal framework provided by the ISA and are subject to the same laws as traditional securities. |
| United Arab Emirates | No Regulation | No federal regulations, but very well-defined legislation at regulator-level. Both ADGM and DFSA have provided some form of guidance on Security Tokens. |
| Thailand | No Regulation | Legal approval of ICOs has already been made by Thailand's Securities and Exchange Commission. STO application criteria expected to be released soon. |
| Singapore | Regulated | Must receive approval from the MAS and be compliant with the Securities and Futures Act. |
| Japan | Regulated | Regulated under the FIEA. |
| Hong Kong | Regulated | Regulated under a framework provided by the SFC. |
| China | Banned | STOs and ICOs are banned and constitute illegal financial activity. |
| South Korea | Regulated | STO will be in regulated financial system in South Korea due to the changes of Electronic Securities Act and the Capital Markets Act, which will be implemented in 2027. |
| Malaysia | Regulated | Must receive approval from the Securities Commission Malaysia and Labuan Financial Services Authority |

== See also ==
- Initial coin offering
- Initial public offering
- Alternative currencies
- Private currency
- Digital asset
