= LandlordInvest =

British peer-to-peer lending platform

LandlordInvest Limited
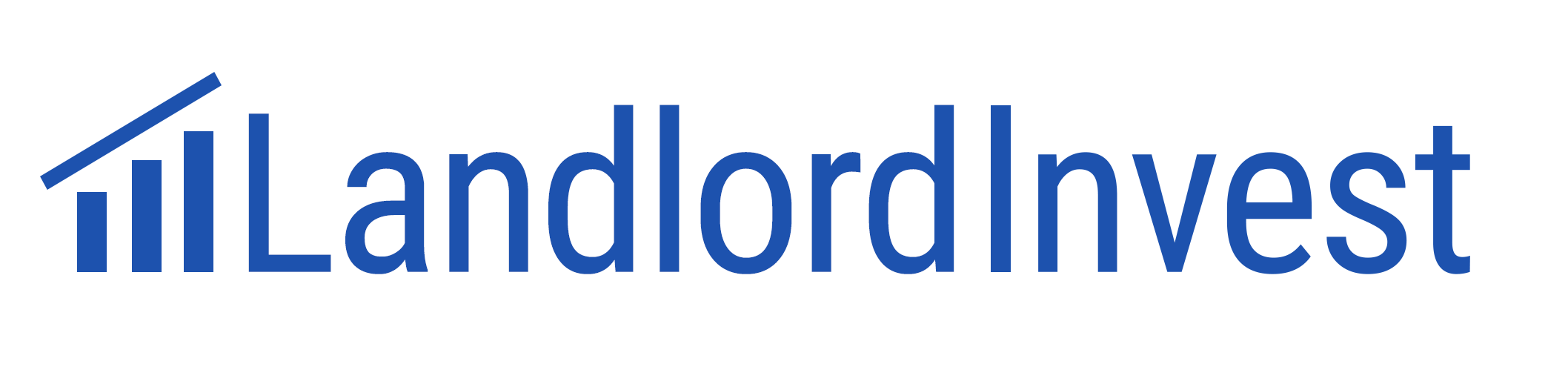
- Type: Ltd.
- Industry: Financial technology, Peer-to-peer lending
- Founded: October 2014
- Founders: Filip Karadaghi; Nik Smirnovs; Joe Vallender
- Headquarters: London, UK
- Area served: UK
- Key people: Filip Karadaghi CEO; Joe Vallender CTO; Nik Smirnovs CFO
- Products: Bridging loans, Development loans
- Website: landlordinvest.com

LandlordInvest is a peer-to-peer lending platform that enables people to invest in residential, commercial, and semi-commercial bridging and development loans. The platform's target audiences are professional property investors and landlords. It was the first residential property-backed Innovative Finance ISA made available to UK savers.

== History ==
LandlordInvest was founded in 2014. The platform was officially launched in December 2016 when it received authorisation from the FCA. In early 2017 LandlordInvest received an ISA manager approval from HMRC, ahead of similar platforms such as Funding Circle, Zopa, and Ratesetter, becoming one of a few companies to offer tax-free returns to peer-to-peer investors.

In May 2017 the platform launched a secondary market which allows investors to sell off their property loan parts. Property Wire Awards listed LandlordInvest as one of three crowdfunding platforms of the year 2017, alongside The House Crowd and Homegrown.

In July 2017 LandlordInvest received an undisclosed sum of seed funding from Alan Gabbay, director of O&H Properties which currently has a £1bn property portfolio in London. Later in the same month the platform passed the £1m lending milestone and amassed 700 investors since it launched in December 2016.

By the end of July 2017 LandlordInvest completed its largest loan to date, a £740,741 bridging loan, bringing its cumulative lending to £2m. LandlordInvest published its loan book for the first time on 5 December 2017, marking its one-year anniversary.

As of June 2018, the P2P platform has lent more than £5m across 25 bridging and buy-to-let loans. It stopped offering buy-to-let loans in December 2022.

Filip Karadaghi, chief executive of LandlordInvest, was listed as one of the 50 most influential people in the UK's P2P sector in November 2018.

In November 2019 LandlordInvest passed the £8m lending milestone, where investors funded £8.7m of loans with £6.7m of repaid capital.

Another lending milestone was passed by the lending platform in November 2020 which, at the time, had lent more than £10m in residential and commercial real estate loans to professional property investors. The platform had lent out over £17m and paid investors over £1.7m in interest as of June 2023.

4thWay, the world's first ratings and research agency for online lending, such as P2P and marketplace lending, rated LandlordInvest "Exceptional" in May 2021.

== Business Model ==
LandlordInvest is an online marketplace that matches professional property investors and landlords looking for financing with investors that are looking to invest in asset-backed products with a monthly income. The platform provides secured borrowing to landlords seeking between £30,000 and £750,000. The minimum investment amount is £1,000, which was increased from £100 in July 2021. Investors lend money to eligible borrowers and receive money from the interest charged on loans, while LandlordInvest covers the costs of running the platform by charging borrowers an arrangement fee on each funded loan and by deducting a servicing fee from monthly interest payments to investors.

=== Returns ===
The platform is holding out the prospect of returns of up to 12% per annum. In its first year of operation, LandlordInvest facilitated more than £2.7m of lending through its platform, with an average loan amount of £210,535, an average LTV of 63.7%, and an average annual gross return to investors of 11.1%.

=== Secondary market ===
In March 2018 the platform's secondary market reached £1m in sales, with a total of 1,393 loan sales completed and an average transaction value of £730. As of November 2019, there has been £2.3m of secondary market sales on the platform. By April 2023, investors had traded over £5m between each other.

=== IFISA ===
LandlordInvest was the first P2P lender to offer a property-backed IFISA. LandlordInvest reached over £2m in subscriptions for its Innovative Finance ISA after having raised £1.65m in subscriptions in the 2017-18 tax year, an increase of 292.5% compared to the £419,835 of subscriptions made in the previous tax year. LandlordInvest's Innovative Finance ISA offers returns of up to 12.3% per annum.
