= Chris Larsen =

American entrepreneur and investor

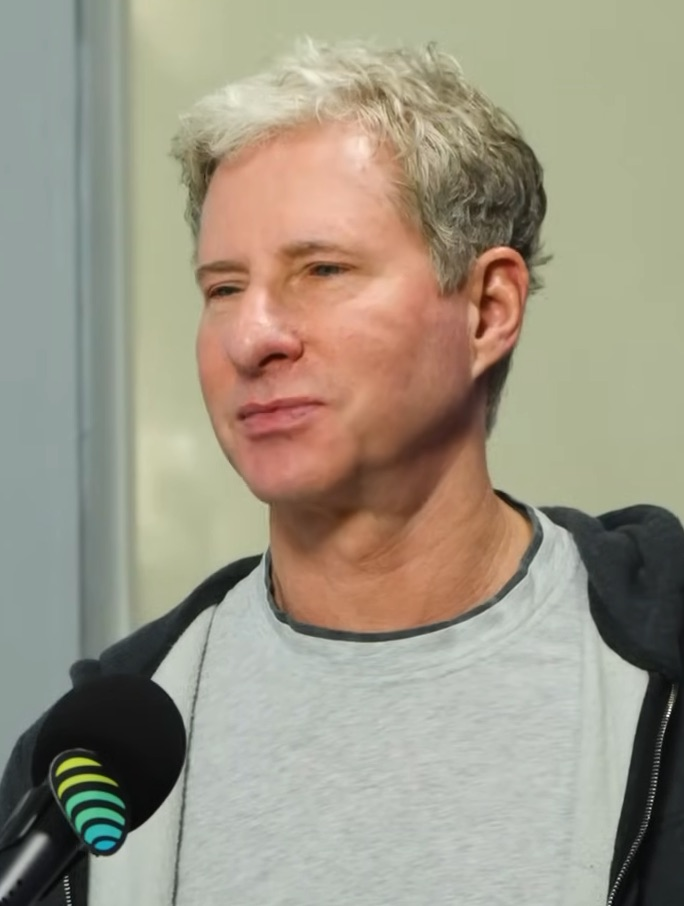
- Larsen in 2025
- Born: 1960 (age 65–66); San Francisco, California, U.S.
- Education: San Francisco State University (BS); Stanford University (MBA)
- Title: Executive Chair of Ripple Labs

Christian Larsen (born 1960) is an American business executive and angel investor best known for co-founding several Silicon Valley technology startups, including one based on peer to peer lending. In 1996, he co-founded the online mortgage lender E-Loan, and during his tenure as CEO E-Loan became the first company to freely provide consumers' FICO credit scores. By 2000, E-Loan's market value was estimated at $1 billion In 2005, Larsen left the company when it was sold to Banco Popular. In 2006, he co-founded Prosper Marketplace and was CEO until 2012. Later in 2012, he co-founded the company Ripple Labs, Inc., which developed Ripple, software that enables the instant and direct transfer of money between two parties.

Self-described as "radically pro-consumer," Larsen has been a vocal advocate of financial privacy in California, and in 2001 he co-founded the coalition Californians for Privacy Now. He has appeared as a speaker at industry events such as Sibos, SWIFT's flagship conference, and written articles for publications such as American Banker. He is also a board-member or advisor for organizations such as Credit Karma, the Electronic Privacy Information Center (EPIC), Qifang, and Betable.

On January 4, 2018, Forbes estimated Larsen's worth at $59 billion, briefly putting him ahead of Mark Zuckerberg and into fifth place in their list of world's richest people. In 2020, he ranked No. 319 in the Forbes 400 list of the richest people in America.

In 2020, Larsen and Ripple each donated US$1 million to five San Francisco food banks for COVID-19 relief efforts.

== Early life and education ==
Christian Larsen was born in San Francisco, California, in 1960. His mother worked as a freelance illustrator, while his father worked as an aircraft mechanic for United Airlines at San Francisco International Airport. After high school, Larsen attended San Francisco State University, where he earned a B.S. in international business and accounting in 1984. He began working for Chevron after college, doing financial audits in Brazil, Ecuador, and Indonesia. He graduated with an M.B.A. from the Stanford Graduate School of Business in 1991.

== Business career ==
=== Development of E-Loan (1992–1998) ===
In the early 1990s, Larsen began working at a mortgage lender in Palo Alto, California. Becoming friends with his colleague Janina Pawlowski, they quit their jobs together in 1992 to found a mortgage business, By 1996, they had switched their focus from loans to the development of a mortgage lending website. Both Larsen and Pawlowski had been frustrated with aspects of the mortgage lending industry, and saw the internet as a way to circumvent agent commissions and other fees. Initially raising $450,000 in funding from friends and family, Larsen and Pawlowski moved from their small Palo Alto office to a larger "low-rent site" in nearby Dublin to work on the project.

The E-Loan website became accessible to the public in 1997, and had success as one of the first online mortgage lenders in the United States. The website allowed borrowers to search and shop for loans directly, without the fees charged by brokers and sales agents. The website would later begin offering direct home equity and car loans as well. By 1998, E-Loan was running into difficulty funding their operations. Pawlowski was chief executive officer for the first two years, and in 1998 she offered to switch jobs with Larsen, taking Larsen's previous role of President.

=== E-Loan funding and public offering (1998–2000) ===
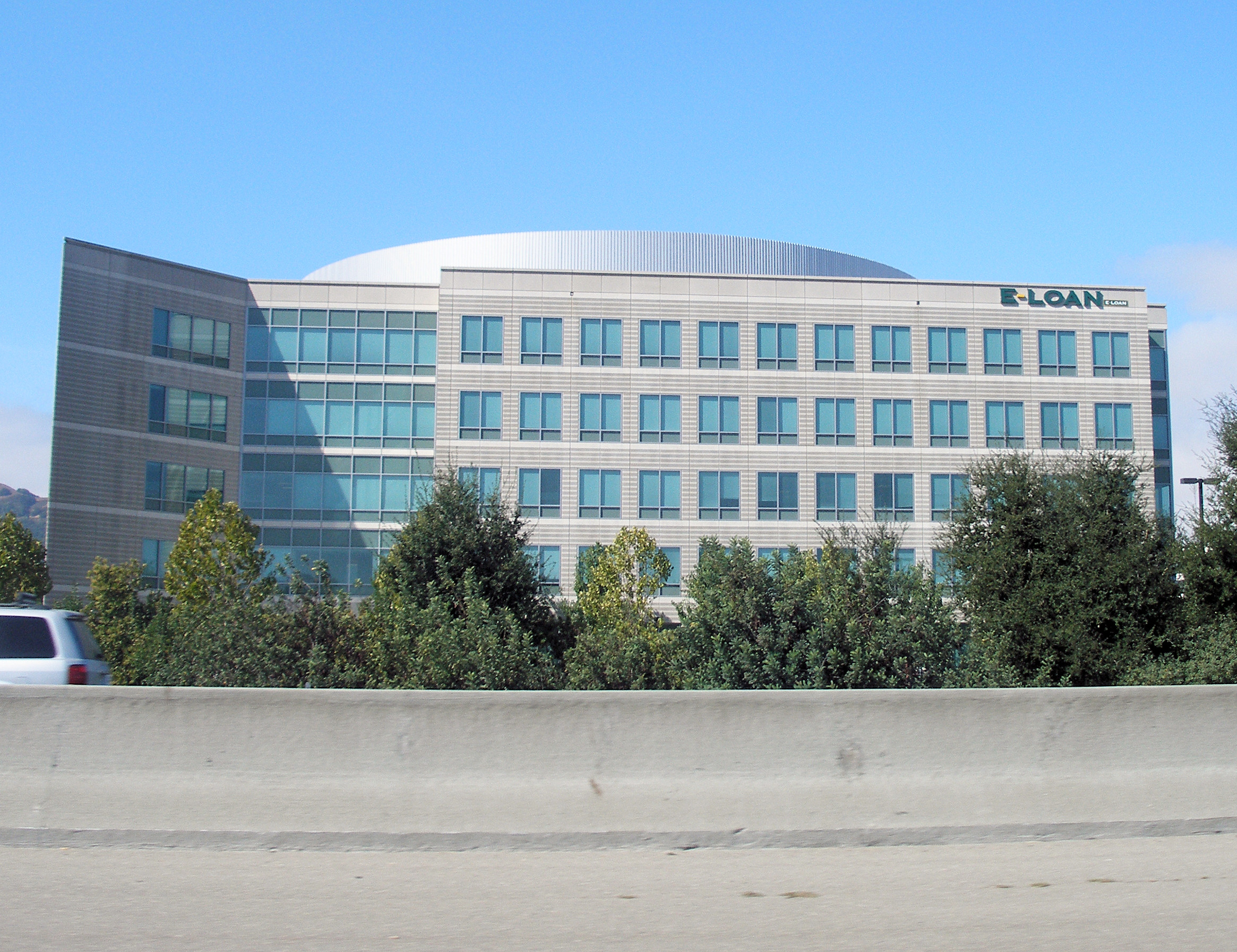
E-Loan's former headquarters in Pleasanton, California (now occupied by Workday, Inc.).

Pawlowski and Larsen were in talks with Intuit over a $130 million buyout in the fall of 1998. Forbes wrote that "Pawlowski and Larsen, who together held a 40% stake and had placed 20% more in an employee stock plan, would each walk away with $10 million in cash and $16 million in Intuit stock." Days before the deal closed in August, however, Yahoo CEO Timothy Koogle pitched a deal to buy a 23% stake of E-Loan's outstanding shares for $25 million. Both Larsen's and Pawlowski's payouts would be less, but they would retain control of the company and the E-Loan brand would survive. Choosing to work with Yahoo, E-Loan also raised venture capital from Softbank and Sequoia Capital. In 1998 E-Loan had total annual revenues of $6.8 million, and the following year Larsen offered the role of CEO back to Pawlowski, though she elected to remain President.

In late March 1999, E-Loan filed for an initial public offering, and it went public in June 1999. The company processed $470 million of mortgage loans in the first quarter of 1999, and by the second financial quarter, revenues for the year had reached $4.6 million. E-Loan lost $13 million in the third quarter of 1999, though revenues overall had grown from the year before by 200%. As of October 1999 the company employed around 350 people. That year overall E-Loan processed 5000 loans, which at 25% of the online mortgage loan market was the highest percent of any online company. By February 2000, E-Loan's market value was estimated at $1 billion, with Larsen as CEO and chairman. During his tenure E-Loan became the first company to freely provide consumers' FICO credit scores.

=== Privacy activism and E-Loan sale (2001–2005) ===
Larsen has described himself as "radically pro-consumer," and in the early 2000s he became a vocal advocate of financial privacy in California. In 2001, a bill sponsored by Assemblywoman Jackie Speier proposed a requirement for consumers to opt in before financial services companies could share or sell personal information such as bank balances, phone numbers, and social security numbers. While the bill had public support, it was initially defeated by pro-business legislators. In response, Larsen co-founded the coalition Californians for Privacy Now, helping fund the project with $1 million of his own money. Larsen spearheaded the collection of 600,000 signatures in support of Speier's bill, which was almost double the required amount to issue a ballot to state voters. The signatures, combined with a lobbying campaign by Consumer Watchdog throughout 2002, led to major financial firms and legislators withdrawing their opposition, and the bill passed in August 2003. Speier acknowledged Larsen's influence on the ruling, stating "without Chris Larsen, California's financial privacy law, which sets the standard for the rest of the nation, would never have become a reality."

As of May 2004, E-Loan had sold over $18.9 billion in consumer loans since its inception, and the company had remained profitable for eight quarters in a row. Larsen stepped down as CEO in early 2005 to start Prosper Marketplace and remained chairman until E-Loan was sold to Banco Popular in 2005.

=== Prosper Marketplace (2005–2011) ===
In 2005, Larsen and John Witchel co-founded Prosper Marketplace, with Larsen as CEO. From 2006 to 2009, Prosper operated a variable rate model, acting as an eBay-style online auction marketplace with lenders and borrowers ultimately determining loan rates using a Dutch auction-like system. Through the website, borrowers can request personal loans, while Prosper handles the servicing of the loan and distributes borrower payments and interest back to the loan investors. Prosper also makes borrowers' "credit grades" public, and verifies identities and select personal data. Larsen himself had funded 450 loans through the website as of 2008, with borrowers as diverse as homeowners, college students, credit-card users, and entrepreneurs. By 2008, Prosper had facilitated the funding of over $120 million in loans, with an average loan amount of $7,000. In 2008 Fast Company named Prosper to its Fast 50 List of the "most innovative companies of the year."

External videos
- Jim Breyer, a partner at Accel Investments, interviews Chris Larsen about Prosper at an industry panel (October 25, 2006)

The company soon ran into regulatory opposition from the U.S. Securities and Exchange Commission (SEC), as current loan regulations were focused on traditional banks, not technology startups. In 2008, Prosper filed its first prospectus with the SEC, changing its business model to use pre-set rates based on a formula evaluating each prospective borrower's credit risk. In 2011, Larsen was outwardly supportive of the Occupy Wall Street movement, raising money to help feed protesters at the nearby OWS encampment in San Francisco. By the end of the year, Prosper had facilitated $271 million in peer-to-peer loans, and the company had received a total of $74.5 million in funding from investors such as Jim Breyer, Tim Draper, Omidyar Network, Nigel Morris, and Court Coursey. On March 15, 2012, Larsen announced that he would be resigning from his role as CEO, though he remained chairman of the company.

=== OpenCoin and Ripple Labs (2012–2020) ===
External videos
- Chris Larsen interviewed about Ripple by Deirdre Bolton on Bloomberg Television's Money Moves (2014)

In September 2012, Larsen co-founded the company OpenCoin, which began developing a new payment protocol called Ripple, based on a concept developed by Ryan Fugger. The Ripple protocol enables the instant and direct transfer of money between two parties. As such the protocol can circumnavigate the fees and wait times of the traditional correspondent banking system, and any type of currency can be exchanged including gold, airline miles, and rupees.

To maintain security OpenCoin programmed Ripple to rely on a common ledger that is "managed by a network of independent validating servers that constantly compare their transaction records." Servers can belong to anyone including banks or market makers. The company also created its own form of digital currency in a manner similar to Bitcoin, using the currency to allow financial institutions to transfer money with negligible fees and wait-time. On May 14, 2013, OpenCoin announced that it had closed a second round of angel funding, and among their earliest investors were Andreessen Horowitz, Google Ventures, and IDG Capital Partners.

In September 2013, OpenCoin changed its name to Ripple Labs, Inc., with Larsen remaining CEO. Ripple Labs then announced that the source code for the peer-to-peer node behind the Ripple payment network was open source. Ripple Labs continued as the primary contributors of code to the consensus verification system behind Ripple, which it said could integrate with banks' IT systems. In 2014 Ripple was the second-largest cryptocurrency by market capitalization, after Bitcoin. Also that month, Ripple Labs was named one of the 50 Smartest Companies by MIT Technology Review. Ripple Labs was then ranked No. 4 on a list by Fast Company of the World's Top 10 Most Innovative Companies Of 2015 In Money.

== Media presence and memberships ==
Larsen has appeared as a speaker or panelist at number of industry events, including the IIF Annual Memberships Meeting in 2014. Larsen has also written articles on banking systems and other technical topics for publications such as American Banker.

In the early 2000s, Larsen established the Chris Larsen Scholarship Fund at San Francisco State University, and the school named him Alum of the Year in 2004. As of 2014, he is a member of the Young Presidents' Organization (YPO) and is a board member or adviser for organizations such as Credit Karma and the Electronic Privacy Information Center (EPIC). He was an advisor to the Silicon Valley Community Foundation's policy committee against payday lending. He is also on the board of Oportun.

== Political involvement ==
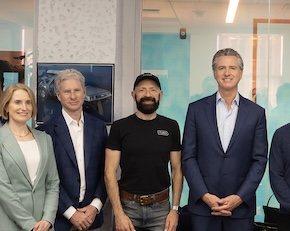
Larsen at a California tech industry leaders meeting with governor Gavin Newsom (far right)

In October 2024, Larsen donated $1 million worth of XRP (at the time of donation) to Future Forward, a super PAC that supported Vice President Kamala Harris' presidential campaign. In total, Larsen has given around $1.9 million to support her campaign directly and through PACs.

Larsen has made several standout donations, including a $1 million donation to Pennsylvania Democratic governor Josh Shapiro and nearly $7,000 to John Deaton, a Massachusetts Republican rival of Democratic senator Elizabeth Warren, a prominent critic of cryptocurrencies. He backed a pro-Biden PAC in 2020, and donated $39,200 to former U.S. representative Katie Porter to support her 2026 California gubernatorial candidacy.

In October of 2025, CNN listed Ripple as a donor to President Donald Trump's ballroom.

During the 2026 midterm elections, Larsen spent $3.5 million backing Alex Bores, who ran but eventually lost for New York's affluent 12th Congressional District in the primary. The race gained attention for becoming a proxy fight between A.I. political groups backed by industry rivals OpenAI and Anthropic over their stance on A.I. legislation.

== See also ==
- List of San Francisco State University people
