= Zidisha =

Nonprofit microlending service

Zidisha Incorporated
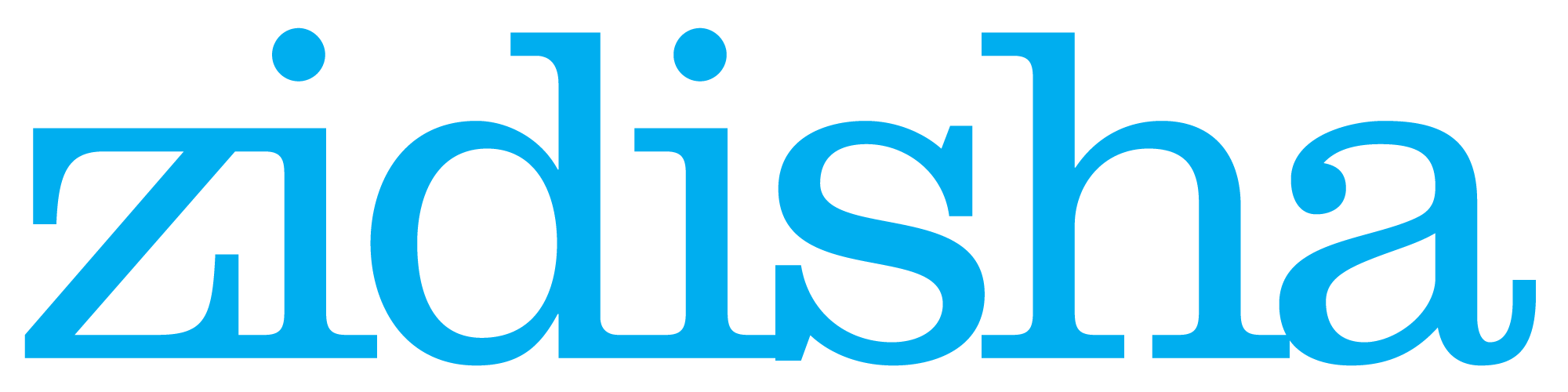
- Named after: Swahili word meaning "to multiply" or "to expand"
- Formation: October 2009; 17 years ago
- Founded at: Sterling, Virginia, United States
- Type: 501(c)(3) Nonprofit
- Tax ID no.: 80-0494876
- Region served: Worldwide
- Methods: Microcredit
- Fields: Economic development
- Revenue: $625,675 (2015)
- Expenses: $170,380 (2015)
- Endowment: $654,079

Zidisha is a peer-to-peer microlending service that allows people to lend small amounts of money directly to entrepreneurs in developing countries. It is the first peer-to-peer microlending service to link borrowers and lenders across international borders without a local microfinance institution intermediary. The organization is named after the Swahili word zidisha (pronounced [zi.ɗi.ʃɑ]), which means "grow" or "expand".

The Zidisha website facilitates microlending transactions between individual web users worldwide and computer-literate, low-income entrepreneurs in developing countries. Users can fund loans, which borrowers use to develop businesses that improve their families' incomes. Borrowers can share business updates and communicate with lenders as they repay loans.

== History ==
Zidisha was founded in October 2009 by Julia Kurnia.

After visiting Niger as Portfolio Analyst for the US African Development Foundation, Kurnia became disillusioned with foreign aid. In 2006, she co-founded the Senegal Ecovillage Microfinance (SEM) Fund with John Fay and Nan Guslander. To keep financing and salary costs low, SEM raised money from the online microlending portal Kiva at 0% interest, and its three co-founders all went without salaries and volunteered their time.

SEM struggled with the sustainability of their model, as they were unwilling to raise interest rates to cover the cost of renting an office and hire loan officers and also unable to find outside donors. Eventually, Kurnia left in August 2009, and SEM began to struggle with delinquent loans, with its portfolio reaching a high of 77.4% delinquency in December, 2010. In response, SEM's team stopped making new loans and focused on collecting funds from their existing borrowers. Kurnia had donated $30k to subsidize SEM's operating costs, but once those donated funds and others ran out, the organization defaulted on 5.1% of its loans and Kiva closed its partnership with SEM in March 2012.

Kurnia's experience at SEM gave her visibility into the high operational costs of traditional microlenders. By 2008, Internet access in developing nations had become widely available enough to make direct peer-to-peer microlending feasible. Kurnia founded Zidisha to connect lenders and borrowers directly, thereby reducing borrower costs.

Zidisha relaunched in January 2014 as one of the first seven non-profits funded by seed accelerator Y Combinator. In March 2014, Y Combinator partner Paul Buchheit donated $100k in a bid to further promote Zidisha online.

As of May 2015, Zidisha has financed $3.4 million in loans to 12,225 borrowers. Zidisha Inc results are distinguished from Zidisha Community. The non-profit is not a lender; it carries no loans on its books.

== Regulatory status ==
Typically, peer-to-peer microlenders offering interest on loans to US lenders are regulated by the Securities and Exchange Commission (SEC). In 2008, the SEC required that peer-to-peer lending companies offering interest on loans to register their offerings as securities, pursuant to the Securities Act of 1933. Accordingly, Prosper was shut down by the SEC on November 24, 2008, and did not reopen until July 2009, after it had registered with the SEC. Lending Club announced its completion of the SEC registration process on October 14, 2008. MYC4, a microlending marketplace focused on African entrepreneurs, similarly announced in 2010 that they are "not allowed to disburse money to North American Investors" because of SEC regulations.

Zidisha has not registered with the SEC, and has publicly stated that they are not a securities broker. The website states in its terms of use that unlike a securities broker, Zidisha is under no obligation to return lender funds and honor withdrawal requests: "Zidisha makes no guarantee or representation that funds lent through its website will be repaid to lenders, regardless of whether the loans financed with lender funds are repaid to Zidisha. Any cash payouts are promotional gifts offered solely at Zidisha's discretion."

The tax treatment of these promotional gifts is unclear. Gifts are taxed in the United States, which would mean that for US lenders, the original loan principal, if withdrawn, would be subject to taxation. Zidisha states in its terms that, "It is the responsibility of website users to report and pay any applicable taxes on any cash payouts received from Zidisha."

== Performance ==
=== 2009-2014 ===
As of June 2014, Zidisha's lenders had raised $2,106,294 for 6,879 individual loans at an average lender interest rate of 5.1% since the organization was founded in 2009.

The status of the $2,106,294 as of June 2014 was as follows:

$1,082,861 (51.4% of amount disbursed) had been repaid to lenders.

$454,189 (21.6% of amount disbursed) was still outstanding with borrowers who are repaying on time (within a threshold of 30 days and $10).

$184,530 (8.8% of amount disbursed) was still outstanding with borrowers who are more than 30 days and $10 late with scheduled repayments.

$15,063 (0.7% of amount disbursed) had been forgiven by the lenders for humanitarian reasons.

$369,748 (17.6% of amount disbursed) had been written off by Zidisha.

=== Performance by country ===
Zidisha's performance has varied by country. For loans disbursed within the year between June 2013 and June 2014, 81.1% of loans in Kenya had been repaid or were being repaid on time, 93% of loans in Burkina Faso had been repaid or were being repaid on time, 92.8% of loans in Niger had been repaid or were being repaid on time, and 92.9% of loans in Indonesia had been repaid or were being repaid on time.

Percent of loans disbursed in past 12 months that are:
Country	Loans raised	Businesses Financed	Average lender interest	Repaid & Repaying On Time	Repaying Late	Forgiven	Written Off
Kenya	$773,667	3,179	6%	81.1%	13.9%	0.1%	5%
Senegal	$55,944	107	4.8%	73.1%	20%	0%	6.9%
Burkina Faso	$113,950	527	3.7%	93%	3.1%	0.2%	3.7%
Guinea	$8,275	19	3.2%	79.3%	18.6%	0.0%	2%
Niger	$2,425	15	2.8%	92.8%	3.3%	0.0%	3.9%
Ghana	$19,034	129	6.8%	80.2%	19.7%	0.0%	0.0%
Indonesia	$13,323	95	3.8%	92.9%	7.2%	0.0%	0.0%
Benin	$93	1	5.6%	45.5%	54.5%	0.0%	0.0%
Zambia	$121	3	0.3%	34.9%	65.1%	0.0%	0.0%
All Countries	$988,611	4,086	5.6%	82.2%	13%	0.1%	4.7%

=== June 2014 to May 2015 ===
In the year from June 2014 to May 2015, Zidisha lenders raised $1,313,316 for 7,693 individual loans at an average lender interest rate of 3.8% (note: Zidisha discontinued interest in February 2015).

The status of the $1,313,316 as of May 2015 was as follows:

$555,190 (42.3% of amount disbursed) had been repaid to lenders.

$521,405 (39.7% of amount disbursed) was still outstanding with borrowers who are repaying on time (within a threshold of 30 days and $10).

$92,437 (7.0% of amount disbursed) was still outstanding with borrowers who are more than 30 days and $10 late with scheduled repayments.

$37 (0.1% of amount disbursed) had been forgiven by the lenders for humanitarian reasons.

$46,885 (3.6% of amount disbursed) had been written off by Zidisha.

=== Changes in reporting methodology ===
Zidisha had previously reported a repayment rate of 98% as of August 2012, but this repayment rate counted only those loans whose final repayment dates had occurred 6+ months ago. Zidisha stated that "incorporating such a long time lag made the statistics less useful, and so we modified the calculations to include all loans whose final repayment dates have already arrived, even though they have not yet had time to be written off."

The revised repayment rate (not incorporating the time lag) was 89.3% as of August 2013. Zidisha subsequently made its write-off policy stricter, classifying a loan as written off if it is not repaid six months after its due date, or if the borrower has not made any payments for six months. This stricter writeoff policy resulted in a reported writeoff rate of 17.6% of ended loans as of June 29, 2014.

Zidisha defines its repayment and writeoff statistics more conservatively than other microlending websites. For example, Kiva, the world's largest microlending website, reports any loans not yet written off as repaid, even if they are still outstanding with the borrower. Kiva also counts repayments made by field partners to cover borrower defaults as part of its on-time repayment rate.

Some observers argued that Zidisha's writeoff policy is too strict, as it has often resulted in loans that are still actively repaying (but over six months late) as being written off. Zidisha's stated rationale to maintaining such a strict writeoff policy is that they wish to err on the side of reporting high write-off rates to prospective lenders so that they fully understand the risks of lending with Zidisha, and Zidisha continues to follow up with written off loans and return the repayments collected to lenders.

== Recognition ==
Zidisha has been a finalist and semifinalist for the Echoing Green foundation for early-stage social enterprises, and was an Ashoka Fellow nominee.

In 2014 Zidisha became one of the first seven nonprofits to graduate from seed accelerator Y Combinator.

== See also ==
- Microcredit
- Peer-to-peer lending
- Social entrepreneurship
