= Social media use in the financial services sector =

Social media in the financial services sector refers to the use of social media by the financial services sector to promote and distribute financial services. Social media is used in various aspects of the financial industry including customer service, marketing, and product development. It has enabled financial institutions to extend their reach through direct and real-time communication with customers, fostering more personal connections. It also allows individuals to talk to other individuals creating lending and trading via social groups as well as developing new financial services by fintech startup companies.

In terms of marketing, social media is utilized by both traditional financial companies as well as disruptive fintech companies such as peer-to-peer lending (P2P) companies. The financial industry has used information technology since its inception in the 1960s and social media fits in with this ongoing development. Larger, traditional financial firms have integrated social media into their marketing strategies.

Companies in the financial sector are subject to strict regulations that include how they use social media. In the United States, the Financial Industry Regulatory Authority (FINRA) is a key regulator that sets rules how financial firms can interact with consumers. This includes ensuring that social media posts follow financial advertising rules, such as being fair and balanced and not providing misleading information, and that financial advice is not provided by unqualified personnel, such as influencers.

== History ==
In 2003, at the beginning of social media development, MySpace was founded as a "social networking service." It allowed people to create a profile, connect with other people, and post videos, pictures, and songs. As MySpace grew in popularity, it attracted interest from companies wishing to promote their brands on the social platform. They were joined by Facebook and in 2010 by Instagram. Financial service firms were initially slow to adapt to promotion via social media but soon joined other big firms after they saw the success other industries had in engaging with younger people.

== Uses ==
=== Branding ===
While companies are able to connect with more people remotely through providing online financial services, their branding strategy has shifted from customized to standardized. Prior to the outbreak of technology, most banks used customized branding where they targeted only customers in their regions. Businesses can now use technology to operate beyond their geographic location and maintain a consistent image across multiple countries with standardized branding. By being able to extend a consistent brand reputation across a wider geographic location, financial services companies can take advantage of economies of scale in advertising cost, lower administrative complexity, lower entry into new markets, and improved cross-border learning within the company.

=== Customer engagement ===
Online banking reduced face-to-face interaction between customers and their banks. Most banking transactions can now be conducted online or through mobile devices, rather than at a local branch with a teller. Social media provides a channel for firms to maintain personal contact with customers, replicating some of the interaction that was previously available at local branches. For example, a bank's Facebook page may feature an employee profile describing their job duties, which serves to present a more human face for larger institutions.

=== Lending ===
Social media is a core marketing channel for online peer-to-peer lending as well as small business lenders. Since these companies operate exclusively online, it makes sense for them to market online through social media channels. They are able to grow and find new lenders and buyers by utilizing social networks.

=== Trading ===
Social trading is an alternative way of analyzing financial data by looking at what other traders are doing and comparing, copying and discussing their techniques and strategies. Prior to the advent of social trading, investors and traders were relying on fundamental or technical analysis to form their investment decisions. Using social trading investors and traders could integrate into their investment decision-process social indicators from trading data-feeds of other traders.

Investors also use platform like Reddit, Signal messaging or WeChat to create social communities to discuss investments and finance. In some cases they use this to join together using meme stocks to move financial markets, such as the 2021 GameStop short squeeze incident. They can also use social groups to launch and promote new products such as cryptocurrencies.

Investing application like WeBull incorporate a forum style messaging system on each stock that is available for trading. Financial brokers such as Fidelity Investments, Interactive Brokers, and E-Trade have moved to incorporate community features in their investment apps.

== Regulations ==
The use of social media by investors and financial services professionals for business purposes is subject to regulatory oversight, in the United States this is done primarily by the Financial Industry Regulatory Authority (FINRA). FINRA's rules, designed to protect investors from misleading information in all communications and this also applies to social media communications. This includes ensuring that social media posts follow financial advertising rules, such as being fair and balanced and not providing misleading information, and that advice is not provided by unqualified personnel, such as influencers and bank staff acting in a personal capacity. Financial firms have to maintain books and records of all interaction with customers and this includes social media.

== New products and services ==
Social media has created entirely new products for the financial services sector, revolutionizing products and developing new industries through the merging of social technology and financial services. Fintech startups use social media to promote products to get them established.

Several developing nations have used social media to leapfrog traditional financial technology; for example, WeChat Pay, which developed from the Chinese WeChat social media platform, became a major payment system in China within a few years. In 2015, according to consulting firm Accenture, 390 million people in China had registered to use mobile banking. This figure is more than the population of the United States. In the United States, the fintech company Venmo combines technology and financial services on a social platform.

Other financial technology companies that have used social media to develop or promote financial products include:

- Lending Club – One of the first peer-to-peer lending businesses
- OnDeck Capital – A US online-only lending business
- Funding Circle – A UK-based online lending company
- Wise – A global online money transfers company
- Kabbage – A US online unsecured loan company later acquired by American Express
- Avant – A US online unsecured loan company
- Zopa – A UK online neobank providing peer-to-peer lending

== Risks ==
=== Reputational damage ===
Due to the real-time nature of social media, financial services companies can be impacted by potential reputational issues. Any negative experience by customers can easily be shared online and could become a viral phenomenon, those comments could likely have a detrimental effect on the company’s stock price and reputation. On the other hand, any positive experience a customer has can also be shared online. However, positive experiences are much less likely to become viral.

=== Scams ===
The nature of social media makes it easy to target individuals without being seen by the wider community, this allows scammers to target individuals. Example include romance scams such as the pig butchering scam where an individual is tricked to transfer funds or assets to the scammer over social media making it hard for law enforcement to track them or recover funds.

=== Customer privacy ===
Customer privacy is important for the financial services industry. It is critical that customer information such as a bank account numbers and other personal information is kept private. However, this information can be leaked if for example, a customer is unhappy with a bank’s service, they may tweet at the bank expressing their frustrations and include their name and account number.

== See also ==
- Cryptocurrency and crime
- Influencer marketing
- Marketing communications
- Online advertising
- Social media in the fashion industry
