= Lendico =

German company

Lendico Global Services
- Type: Private
- Industry: Personal finance, Software
- Headquarters: Berlin, Germany
- Area served: Germany
- Key people: Sven Foos, Thomas Becher, Verena Freyer, Martin Kohlbeck, Florian Strobel
- Products: Loans, Investments
- Number of employees: 160
- Parent: ING Diba
- Website: www.lendico.com, www.lendico.de

Lendico was a multinational company, operating a peer-to-peer lending platform. It was taken over by Dutch bank ING Groep in early 2018 and now operates as a subsidiary. The international online marketplace for business and consumer lending was founded in December 2013 by the incubator and venture capitalist, Rocket Internet. After launching in Germany, the company expanded into Spain, Poland, Austria, South Africa, the Netherlands and Brazil. Using the crowdfunding model, the company based in Berlin, Germany, directly connects investors and private and business borrowers. Lendico is led by Friedrich Hubel and co-founder Clemens Paschke. Currently, Lendico Brazil still exists but is an independent company from Lendico Global Services.

== History ==
Founded in December 2013 in Berlin, Lendico's idea was to take to Germany, and to all of Europe, a lending model that was successful in the United States, peer to peer lending, or lending between people.

Inspired by the business model of the US peer-to-peer lending platform Lending Club and UK based company Zopa, Lendico is a marketplace that enables the link between borrowers and investors. During the first 20 months, the company established itself in Austria, Brazil, the Netherlands, Poland, Spain and South Africa, replicating the expansion plan usually used by its creator, Rocket Internet.

== Business Model ==
The loans are personal loans or SME loans and range between €1,000 - €150,000 in Germany. The interest fee is calculated on the basis of the borrower’s credit score, credit history, desired loan amount and the borrower’s debt-to-income ratio. Lendico determines whether the borrower is creditworthy and assigns to its approved loans a credit grade that determines the payable interest rate and the fees. The loan period can range between 1 and 5 years and be repaid at any time. Only 10% of applications are received on the platform.

Lendico operates completely online with no branch network and relies on proprietary technology to reduce costs and optimize the handling of loan applications. Lendico has repeatedly been nominated as best credit marketplace. In August 2015 Deutsche Börse Venture Network selected Lendico to become member of its programme of growth companies and national and international investors.

== See also ==
- Comparison of crowd funding services
- Disintermediation
