= Zencap =

German peer-to-peer lending platform

Zencap Global Services
- Type: Private
- Industry: Financial services Software
- Founder: Dr. Christian Grobe, Dr. Matthias Knecht
- Headquarters: Berlin, Germany
- Area served: Germany, Spain, The Netherlands
- Products: Peer-to-peer lending
- Number of employees: 65
- Parent: Rocket Internet
- Website: Official website

Zencap was a German company, operating a peer-to-peer lending platform, which allowed private savers to lend money directly to small and medium-sized businesses in Germany, Spain, and the Netherlands. Using the crowdfunding model, the company based in Berlin, Germany aimed to create a direct link between private lenders and small businesses seeking loans. As of December 2014, Zencap had facilitated 5 million Euro in loans to small and medium-sized firms.

In October 2015, the company was merged with Funding Circle, being active on UK and US.

== Origin ==
The company, based in Berlin, was founded in March 2014 by Christian Grobe and Matthias Knecht, with support from Rocket Internet.

== Lending ==
The business model resembled the US peer-to-peer lending platform Lending Club and UK-based company Funding Circle. Zencap facilitated small business loans from 10,000 to 250,000 euros. Zencap determined whether the borrower was creditworthy and assigned a credit grade that determined the payable interest rate and the fees. Zencap itself charged borrowers a 1% to 4.5% origination fee. The loan period ranged between 6 and 60 months while the loan could be repaid without an early repayment fee at any time. Conditions varied between countries.

Der Tagesspiegel quoted founder Christian Grobe, "We are very strict with the risk assessment." Once approved, businesses posted their loan request on the Zencap marketplace, where private lenders were able to choose which businesses they wanted to lend money to.

== Funding Circle acquisition of Zencap ==
In October 2015, Zencap was acquired by UK based Funding Circle, another lending platform in Europe. Zencap was active in Germany, Spain and the Netherlands. The merge made Funding Circle one of the main peer to business lending leaders in Europe.

== See also ==
- Debt-to-income ratio
- Comparison of crowd funding services
- Disintermediation
