= Qifang (website) =

Chinese online peer-to-peer lending community

Qifang (Chinese: 齐放; pinyin: qí fàng) was a Chinese peer-to-peer lending platform focused on student loans. Founded in August 2007 and based in Shanghai, the company directly connected individual lenders with student borrowers, with loan payments made to colleges and universities rather than to borrowers themselves. The company's name derives from the Mao Zedong phrase "百花齐放" (Bǎi huā qí fàng), meaning "let a hundred flowers bloom". Qifang was recognised in 2009 by the World Economic Forum as a Technology Pioneer, becoming the first Chinese company to receive the designation. The platform ceased operations in April 2013.

== History ==
=== Founding and early development ===
Qifang was founded in August 2007 by Calvin Chin, a Chinese American entrepreneur who was born in Michigan and educated at Yale University. Chin had previously worked in investment banking and held leadership positions at technology start-ups in New York, Silicon Valley, and Shanghai before relocating to China. He also held an MBA from TRIUM (a joint programme of NYU, the London School of Economics, and HEC Paris).

Chin initially raised US$200,000 in angel funding from investors in Hong Kong and other parts of Asia. The platform was inspired by existing Western peer-to-peer lending services such as Prosper and Zopa, but Chin adapted the model to suit the Chinese market, where consumer credit infrastructure was still underdeveloped and individual credit histories were largely nonexistent. Qifang concentrated exclusively on student loans, in part because support for education was viewed favourably by Chinese government authorities.

=== Leadership changes and expanded model ===
Tingbin Tang, a serial entrepreneur originally from a village in Hunan province, later joined Qifang as chief operating officer and subsequently became CEO. Under Tang's leadership, the company expanded beyond its original peer-to-peer lending model to include additional forms of fundraising. Tang introduced a donation programme for primary and middle school students who could not be expected to repay loans, alongside the existing lending model for college students.

In April 2013, Qifang ceased operations.

== Operations and business model ==
A key feature of the platform was its reliance on social pressure as a substitute for formal credit assessment. Because each borrower's family members were named on the loan, a failure to repay would result in a public loss of face for the borrower's parents and relatives - a powerful deterrent in Chinese culture.

In its first six months, Qifang arranged approximately 2,500 loans with an average value of about US$400 (RMB 2732.57), and at that time, no defaults had been recorded. Loans had terms ranging from one to three years and carried interest rates of between 5 and 15 percent, with the rate dependent on the perceived creditworthiness of the borrower.

== See also ==
- Peer-to-peer lending
- Prosper Marketplace
- Zopa
