= SocietyOne =

- Industry: Peer-to-peer lending
- Founded: 6 August 2011
- Founders: Andy Taylor, Matt Symons, Greg Symons
- Headquarters: Sydney, Australia
- Key people: Mark Jones, CEO
- Products: unsecured personal loans, secured livestock loans
- Number of employees: 89 (2018)
- Parent: MoneyMe
- Website: www.societyone.com.au

SocietyOne is an Australian peer-to-peer lending company.

== History ==
Based on UK peer-to-peer lending businesses such as Zopa and Ratesetter, SocietyOne was founded in August 2011 by Andy Taylor, Matt Symons, and Greg Symons. In March 2016, Jason Yetton was hired as CEO; he was succeeded in the role by Mark Jones in July 2018.

== Finance ==
In the third quarter of 2017, it was reported that a total of over $350 million had been borrowed on Society One’s platform since 2012. As of June 30, 2018, that number reached $465 million, and the total valuation of the lending book reached $218 million. Despite its growth, Society One is expected to need a $500 million lending book to start breaking even.
