= MaxMyInterest =

Financial technology service and software platform

MaxMyInterest (Max) is a financial technology (FinTech) service operated by Six Trees Capital LLC. Max is a software platform that allocates individuals' cash among their own bank accounts so that they earn the most interest possible while staying within the limits for FDIC government-deposit insurance. The service works for both individuals and their financial advisors. Headquartered in New York City, Six Trees was founded by former Citigroup investment banker Gary E. Zimmerman in 2013.

== Milestones ==
The Max service launched in April 2014.

In the spring of 2015, Max participated in the FinTech Innovation Lab, an accelerator program run by the Partnership Fund for New York City and Accenture, and presented at the Lab's Demo Day in June.

In October 2015, Max began offering services to businesses that want to earn more on FDIC-insured cash, through a partnership with The American Deposit Management Co. of Delafield, Wisc.

Max won a UBS Future of Finance Acceleration Award in December 2015.

The Max Advisor Dashboard, which allows financial advisors to oversee their clients' Max accounts on their behalf, launched in January 2016.

In July 2018, Max was added as a cash option for clients by Dynasty Financial Partners.

In November 2018, Max and Radius Bank launched a 60-second account-opening process.

In January 2019, the yield on the platform reached 2.46%.

In September 2019, Max and Radius Bank partnered together to launch Max Checking, a no fee, no minimum balance checking product which features 1% APY and free ATM access worldwide.
