= Renaud Laplanche =

American businessman

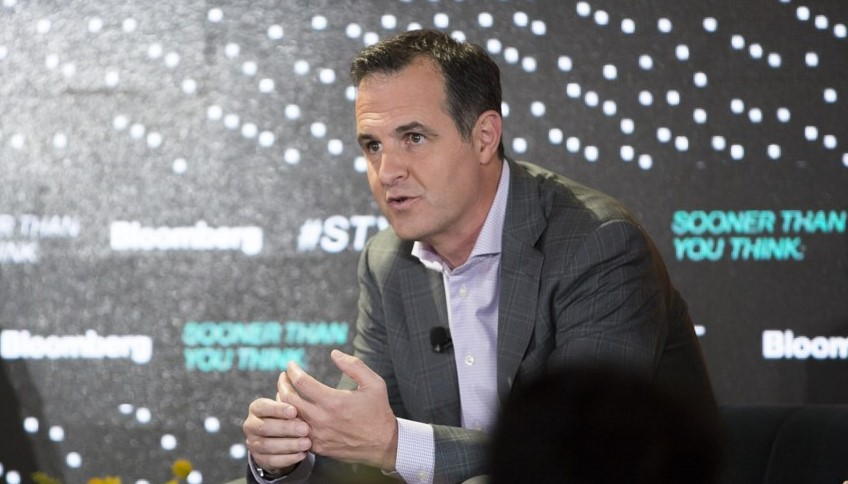
- Born: 1970 (age 55–56); France
- Education: HEC Paris; Université de Montpellier; London Business School
- Occupations: Entrepreneur, business executive
- Years active: 1995–present
- Known for: TripleHop Technologies (MatchPoint), Lending Club, Upgrade, Inc.

Renaud Laplanche (born 1970) is a French-American entrepreneur and business executive. He is the co-founder and CEO of the fintech company, Upgrade, Inc. Prior to founding the company, Laplanche co-founded and served as the CEO of Lending Club, an American peer-to-peer lending company, for a decade. Before his tenure at Lending Club, he also co-founded and led TripleHop Technologies, the maker of the MatchPoint software, which was subsequently acquired by Oracle Corporation.

== Early life and education ==
Renaud Laplanche was born in 1970 and grew up in France. He was interested in sailing and raced competitively on the national level, winning the French sailing championships on Lasers, 13.5 ft, one-sail, one-man sailboats, in 1988 and 1990.

Laplanche studied business and law. He received a post-graduate DESS-DJCE (J.D.) degree in Tax and Corporate Law from Université de Montpellier, Montpellier, France, and an MBA degree from HEC Business School in Paris, France, and London Business School.

== Career ==
=== Cleary Gottlieb Steen & Hamilton ===
From 1995 to 1999, Laplanche worked as a securities lawyer and senior associate at the law offices of Cleary Gottlieb Steen & Hamilton. He initially worked in Parisand later moved to New York. During his tenure, Laplanche handled various cases involving mergers, acquisitions, joint ventures, and investment transactions involving technology companies.

=== TripleHop Technologies ===
In New York, Laplanche soon left the law offices and, in 1999, co-founded a software company named TripleHop Technologies with Franck Nazikian. The company operated from an office located in the North Tower of the New York World Trade Center, which was destroyed in the September 11 attacks. TripleHop suffered major losses, including its computers and recently developed software code.

In 2003 TripleHop launched its MatchPoint crawler and search engine for enterprise content. The engine provided a single search point for structured and unstructured data (databases, e-mail, file and document systems, the internet), used Support Vector Machine algorithms for indexing and concept-based retrieval, and collaborative filtering for correlating related topics, created a user profile for each user on the basis of user's search history to tailor query results to particular users, and permitted context-sensitive search where queries were expanded by synonyms from domain-specific thesaurus-type taxonomies.

MatchPoint was adopted by many U.S. media companies (CNN, Turner Broadcasting, AOL, USA Today, ABC News, Dow Jones, The New York Times and others) as their preferred search engine and attracted the attention of major software vendors. In June 2005, TripleHop Technologies was acquired by Oracle Corporation and MatchPoint was integrated with Oracle's other products. Laplanche reportedly earned 10 million USD from the acquisition. He moved to California and from June 2005 to October 2006 worked at Oracle as the Head of Product Management, Search Technologies, managing integration and overseeing sales of search engine products.

=== LendingClub ===
In 2006 Laplanche left Oracle and co-founded LendingClub. He had gotten the idea for the new company when he started TripleHop and found that his credit card carried an 18% interest rate, while he was only earning 1.5% from the bank on high yield certificates of deposit. He thought that by connecting investors directly with borrowers, he could cut the banks out of the equation and deliver lower rates for borrowers and higher returns for investors. LendingClub first launched on Facebook to leverage existing connections among users for testing users' trust and willingness to help one another financially, and to gather user feedback about the new service. At that time, LendingClub was one of Facebook's first applications.

In 2010, after receiving $12 million in funding from venture capital investors, Laplanche developed LendingClub into a full-scale person-to-person lending company. By June 2012, the company had raised $100 million in venture capital. LendingClub completed its IPO on December 10, 2014. The stock price increased 56% on its first day of trading.

In May 2016, following an internal review which found a violation of the company's business practices, Laplanche resigned from LendingClub. The US Securities and Exchange Commission (SEC) investigated LendingClub and claimed that LendingClub, while Laplanche was acting as CEO, directed an outside investment advisory firm to buy LendingClub loans that were at risk of going unfunded. In 2018, LendingClub and Laplanche settled the matter in an administrative proceeding with the SEC, without admitting or denying the findings. In August 2016, he co-founded Upgrade, Inc.

=== Upgrade ===
In August 2016, Laplanche along with other former Lending Club executives started the fintech company, Upgrade, Inc. The company provides credit and mobile banking products. Upgrade raised over $122 million in venture capital from several investors.

In November 2021, Upgrade grew 83% in valuation over four months to $6.28 billion after raising $280 million in a Series F funding round led by Coatue Management and DST Global.

In October 2025, CNBC and others reported that Upgrade had raised $165 million in new equity.

== Recognition ==
Laplanche was named Entrepreneur of the Year at the 2012 BFM Awards. He was the winner of HEC Entrepreneur of the Year award in 2002 and again in 2014. and is a member of the Young Presidents' Organization. In 2013 he received an Ernst & Young Entrepreneur of the Year award for the Northern California region and was a national finalist.

In 2014, Laplanche won the 2014 Economist Innovation Award in the consumer products category for pioneering peer-to-peer consumer lending and was named the best startup CEO to work for by Business Insider. Laplanche was also recognized by the Clinton Global Initiative for expanding access to affordable credit, and on Bloomberg Markets’ Most Influential List, an annual ranking of the World’s top 50 most influential leaders across technology, finance, and politics. Laplanche was honored in the 2016 Tribeca Disruptive Innovation Awards for building the world’s largest online marketplace connecting borrowers and investors.

In September 2020, Laplanche was named Fintech Executive of the Year by Finovate.

== Personal life ==
Since April 2015, Laplanche and co-skipper Ryan Breymaier have held the speed record for sailing from Newport, Rhode Island to Bermuda in 23 hours, 9 minutes, and 52 seconds at the average speed of 27 knots. Between April 1 and September 22, 2015, Laplanche and the crew of the Lending Club 2, a 105-ft maxi-trimaran, held the speed record for sailing from Cowes to Dinard across the English Channel. Between July 15, 2015, and May 17, 2017, Laplanche also held the Transpac record between Long Beach, CA and the Diamond Head lighthouse in Oahu, Hawaii with 3 days, 8 hours, and 9 seconds.
