= AGCC =

AGCC may refer to:

- Marine Corps Air Ground Combat Center Twentynine Palms
- Alderney Gambling Control Commission
- Action for a Global Climate Community
- Anthropogenic global climate change
