= Pagaya Technologies =

Israeli-American technology company

- Type: Public
- Traded as: NYSE: PGY
- Industry: Financial services
- Founded: 2016; 10 years ago
- Founders: Gal Krubiner; Avital Pardo; Yahav Yulzari
- Headquarters: New York City, U.S. and Tel Aviv, Israel
- Key people: Gal Krubine (CEO & co-founder)
- Services: Fintech
- Revenue: ▲US$1,032 million (2024)
- Operating income: ▼US$–488.0 million (2024)
- Net income: ▼US$–401.4 million (2024)
- Total assets: ▲US$1.291 billion (2024)
- Total equity: ▼US$441.5 million (2024)
- Number of employees: 553 (2024)
- Website: Official website

Pagaya Technologies is an Israeli-American financial technology company based in New York City. The company evaluates loan applications using artificial intelligence (AI) with the aim of modernizing credit checks. The company has been listed on the New York Stock Exchange since 2022.

== History ==
Pagaya Technologies was founded in Israel in 2016. The company was founded by Gal Krubiner, Avital Pardo, and Yahav Yulzari with the aim of using AI and machine learning in lending to replace traditional credit checks. Initially, the company acted as an asset manager for institutional clients and, at the same time, developed a data-driven credit model. With the help of private funds and asset-backed securities (ABS), consumer loans were financed at an early stage; by 2020, Pagaya managed assets of more than US$1.6 billion for banks and other institutions and had issued over US$1 billion in ABS. Among the investors in the company was Singapore's sovereign wealth fund GIC.

In September 2021, Pagaya announced a merger with the US acquisition company EJF Acquisition Corp. The SPAC (special purpose acquisition company) transaction valued Pagaya at approximately US$8.5 billion. During the listing process, development and administrative activities were divided between Tel Aviv and New York, and the company claimed that the number of employees grew to aprroximately 1,000 by 2022.

In January 2024, management also announced that it would relocate its headquarters to New York, as the majority of its partners and sales are based in the US; however, the technical development site in Tel Aviv remained unchanged.

At the 2025 Mind the Tech conference in New York, CEO Gal Krubiner presented his vision of the platform serving all major US banks, with the company seeing itself as a bridge between Israeli technology culture and the US financial market.

== Business model ==
Pagaya views itself as a B2B platform connecting banks, lenders, and institutional investors. Its core product is an AI-powered decision-making platform that evaluates credit applications using large datasets and machine learning algorithms. This platform is embedded into partners' workflows via application programming interfaces (APIs): when a banking partner turns down an application, the anonymized data is routed to Pagaya. The models assess creditworthiness, extend their own offer, and Pagaya assumes the credit default risk; the bank retains the customer relationship and earns servicing fees. Funding is provided through forward-flow agreements, the issuance of asset-backed securities (ABS), and proprietary credit funds. For example, a 2024 agreement with asset manager Castlelake allows for the purchase of up to $1 billion in consumer loans, broadening its refinancing base.

The platform targets "second-look" lending to increase partners' approval rates. According to company figures, the underlying dataset covers trillions of dollars in applications, enabling the use of non-traditional creditworthiness indicators. Pagaya's network is active across various credit segments, including unsecured personal loans, auto loans, credit cards, retail buy now, pay later models, and real estate financing; over the long term, the company also aims to expand into the mortgage and insurance sectors. Partners include Prosper, LendingClub, SoFi, U.S. Bank, Ally, Klarna, Visa, and major auto lenders. In terms of its business model, Pagaya focuses on fee income derived from origination and servicing, while credit risk is largely passed on to institutional investors.
