= Dianrong =

点融网 Dianrong
- Company type: Private
- Industry: Personal finance, software, fintech
- Founded: 2012
- Founder: Soul Htite and Kevin Guo
- Headquarters: Shanghai, China
- Area served: Worldwide
- Products: Peer-to-peer lending
- Number of employees: Over 3500
- Website: dianrong.com

Dianrong (Simplified Chinese: 点融网; pinyin: Diǎnróng Wǎng) is an online marketplace lending company headquartered in Shanghai, China. Named the "Lending Club of China", the company was founded in 2012 by Soul Htite, co-founder and former CTO at Lending Club, who joined efforts with Kevin Guo, a PE fund partner and a lawyer from Shanghai to create a company similar to Lending Club in China.

== History ==
In 2012, the co-founder of Lending Club and its former CTO, Soul Htite, came from the United States to China and brought Lending Club's technological know-how with him. He met finance lawyer Kevin Guo, and together they created Dianrong.com.

== Overview ==
As of 2013, Dianrong specialized in small consumer and business loans, ranging in size from 2,500 to 500,000 RMB for personal loans and 50,000 to 2,000,000 RMB for small business loans. Interest rates, loan tenure and fees were based on credit history, income, debt to income ratio, and loan purpose. Tenure varied from 1 month to 24 months, although some 36 month loans had been issued.

As of 2013, people who wanted to receive loans, and people who wanted to offer loans, could each log into the website, and were obligated to provide certain information. People wanting to offer loans provide information about how much risk they are willing to take and when they want to receive returns, and the software presents loan requestors who fit that profile.

As of 2014, origination fees varied from 1% to 5%. Personal loans generally had higher origination fees. Interest rates varied from 9.49% to 23.99%.

== Regulation & risk ==
In 2013, Dianrong.com's default rate was about 1%.

As of 2014, pooling and allocating investor funds was unlawful in the PRC. Consequently, online lending platforms had to function strictly as intermediaries between those buying notes and those borrowing money. Violations of these rules appeared to be widespread.

== Dianrong.com and the Chinese P2P industry ==
The peer-to-peer lending industry in China is very small compared to traditional lending, but is growing rapidly. The market was estimated at $30 million in 2009 and is projected to grow to $7.8 billion by 2015.

Industry churn was severe in 2013. More than 70 companies folded or went bankrupt during the year; 58 in the fourth quarter alone. Even with this thinning of the ranks, there are still approximately 1,000 peer-to-peer companies in the Chinese market, "80 [to] 90 percent" of which "might go bust".

In December 2018, the impact of the market and mainly regulatory changes also affected Dianrong, which led to cash-flow issues resulting in layoffs and office closures. Some employees complained in February 2019 that they have not received salaries for past two months.

== See also ==
- Lending Club
