= Wisr =

- Founded: Australia (2018)
- Founder: David Doust
- Headquarters: Sydney, Australia
- Area served: Australia
- Key people: Andrew Goodwin, Matthew Lewis, Sam Harding, Alexandre Maizy, James Goodwin, Kate Renner, David King and Alvaro Colon.
- Products: Financial services, Unsecured personal loans, Secured personal loans, Secured vehicle loans
- Number of employees: 120
- Website: https://www.wisr.com.au/

Wisr (ASX: WZR) is an Australian non-bank lender offering consumer lending services. It was known for being the first company of its type to be publicly listed in Australia. In March 2018, DirectMoney launched a major company rebrand to Wisr.

== History ==
In March 2018 DirectMoney Finance Pty Ltd rebranded to Wisr Finance Pty Ltd and began an entirely new business model. In 2017, the company had ceased peer-to-peer lending, originating a wholesale off-balance sheet loan funding facility with 255 Finance.

In August 2018, Wisr launched Australia's first credit score comparison site, WisrCredit.

In March 2019, the company launched the Wisr App, Australia's first app that lets the user gather their digital spare change to pay down debt such as credit cards.

In March 2019, Wisr undertook a $15 million capital raise through Placement shares.

In November 2019, the NAB-backed Wisr Warehouse loan funding facility went live with an initial $50 million commitment. The Wisr Warehouse was increased from $95 million to $150 million in July 2020, $250 million in October 2020 and then $350 million in March 2021.

In January 2020, Wisr undertook a $36.5 million capital raise through Placement shares and a share purchase plan (SPP).

In March 2021, Wisr took a 5% ownership in EU-based fintech Arbor.

In May 2021, Wisr undertook an inaugural A$225M ABS transaction (asset-backed securities), supported by a pool of fully amortising unsecured consumer personal loans. The top tranche of the ABS transaction received a AAA Moody's rating.

In June 2021, supported by Goldman Sachs, Wisr undertook a $55 million capital raise through Placement shares and a share purchase plan (SPP). It was oversubscribed.

In August 2023, Wisr announced that it had terminated the employment of CEO Anthony Nantes. He was replaced by Andrew Goodwin. At the same time his brother, John Nantes temporarily recused himself from his position as chairman of the board to avoid perception of conflict of interest.

== Listing ==
On 13 July 2015, Wisr listed on the Australian Securities Exchange through a reverse takeover of Basper Ltd, raising $AU11.2m at 20c per share.

== See also ==
- Peer-to-peer lending
