= The House Crowd =

UK peer to peer lending and crowdfunding platform

- Type: Private limited
- Industry: Investment
- Founded: 2011
- Defunct: 2021
- Fate: Administration
- Headquarters: Manchester, UK
- Website: www.thehousecrowd.com

The House Crowd was a British peer to peer lending and crowdfunding platform that allowed people to invest in bridging loans and property development loans from £1,000. In 2018, the business achieved authorisation from the Financial Conduct Authority and launched their Innovative Finance ISA. As of January 2019, The House Crowd had funded 368 properties, raised over £93 million and paid investors returns in excess of £38 million. The House Crowd was placed into administration on 24 February 2021 and subsequently wound-up.

== History ==
2011-2015 "Buy-To-Let" Property Crowdfunding

The House Crowd was set up in the UK in December 2011 and began trading in March 2012 and was one of the first UK property crowdfunding companies. It was launched at a time when, as The Guardian explains, ‘young professionals hoping to get a foot on the property ladder and people in their 40s or 50s hoping to fund their retirement through buy-to-let investments have had their plans thwarted by booming house prices.’ By June 2014, The Guardian reported that The House Crowd was buying ‘an average of one [property] a week.’ An article two days later by the same publication concluded that ‘the phenomenon of crowdfunding is booming.’ The following month, the Daily Express reported that ‘[The House Crowd] has spent £5 million buying and refurbishing 69 properties in the Manchester area.’

2015-2019 Peer to Peer Lending, Property Development Lending and FCA Regulation

In 2015, The House Crowd began to offer peer to peer lending products on their platform. In 2016, the business began to use their crowdfunding platform to fund new property developments.

In April 2018, The House Crowd raised just over £1.3 million on their platform in a single day. £1.2m of the funds raised were channelled into the Egyptian Mill Development of 41 houses and 15 apartments in Lees, Greater Manchester.

In January 2018, The House Crowd announced that it had 'received full authorisation from the Financial Conduct Authority (FCA) to operate as a peer-to-peer firm.' In March 2018, the business launched an Innovative Finance ISA, where money is invested in peer-to-peer loans and property development investments, with The House Crowd spreading capital over what the company calls 'a diverse portfolio of property loans as far as practicable.'

2019-2021 Loan Book Mismanagement, Financial Difficulties and Administration

From 2019 onwards The House Crowd began to run into severe difficulties, with an ever-increasing ratio of its loan book defaulting on payments to lenders due to poor lending decisions and financial mismanagement by the company's directors.

On 24 February 2021, an illegal loan taken by the CEO Frazer Fearnhead, and the inability of The House Crowd to strengthen its balance sheet, led to the company going into Administration.

All of The House Crowd's active development loans were in default. The company owed investors £52.7m in capital and interest.

All investors in the business via Seedrs and other investment platforms and lenders via its Peer-to-Peer lending platform lost their money.

== Business model ==
Through crowdfunding, The House Crowd gave like minded investors the opportunity to pool their collective capital to fund a variety of investment loans. The House Crowd had several different investment types:

Secured Peer To Peer Lending

This product offered investors the chance to directly lend money to property owners. It's a short-term commitment, the minimum level of investment is £1,000, and all funds are secured against the borrower's land and property. Average returns of 9.2% p.a.

Property Development Investment

This product involved financing new build housing projects. As with peer to peer property lending, investments were secured against the developer's land and property. With this form of funding, investors could expect up to 10% interest over a relatively short loan period.

Auto-Invest

Offered the opportunity to profit from peer to peer lending without managing an investment portfolio at all. Just deposit the funds. Investments were secured across property development loans and bridging loans.

IF ISA

Allowed investors to invest up to £20,000 a year and earn a rate of 7% P.A. tax-free. Investment was diversified across a range of loans (mitigating your risk) all secured against property.

== Risk and regulation ==
The House Crowd was authorised and regulated by the Financial Conduct Authority through Prosper Capital, of which it was an appointed representative As managing director Frazer Fearnhead explained to the BBC, ‘people's investment is protected by the bricks and mortar value of the property and if you want your money back you either need to wait for the property to be sold or sell your share to another investor. We cannot guarantee you will be able to find a buyer but everyone who has wanted to sell so far has managed to do so within a few days.’

== Dragon's Den ==
CEO Frazer Fearnhead appeared on episode 1 of series 13 of Dragon's Den, asking for a £1,000,000 investment for 5% equity in The House Crowd. He failed to secure any investors.

Sarah Willingham stated that Fearnhead's pitch was "the most disrespectful pitch from an individual" and that she was "offended".

In an interview for Virgin Start Ups Fearnhead stated that the business subsequently used their crowdfunding platform to secure the investment they needed.

== Administration ==
On 24 February 2021, with the consent of the FCA, the directors of The House Crowd Limited placed the Company into administration and appointed Frank Ofonagoro, Jeremy Woodside and Frank Wessely of Quantuma Advisory Limited as Joint Administrators. This was due to the significant financial issues that the company was facing.

All of The House Crowd’s active development loans were in default. The company owed investors £52.7m in capital and interest.

It has emerged that The House Crowd had a series of major governance failures in the run-up to its collapse.

Companies House documentation has revealed concerns surrounding a c. £390,000 loan taken out by Frazer Fearnhead, “that breached [the firm’s] credit policy which constituted a reportable matter to the FCA and a conflict of interest”.

This unauthorised loan by Frazer Fearnhead, and the inability of The House Crowd to strengthen its balance sheet, led the company's non-executive directors to conclude that the possibility of the FCA releasing the firm from voluntary requirement measures was likely to be jeopardised. As a result, they recommended the company be put into administration.

Due to, among other reasons, "an environment of poor record keeping and documentation" that have led to "significant challenges", the administrators have not been able to return any loaned sums to lenders.

Investors through Republic Europe (known as Seedrs at the time) who invested £751,191.00 in 2019 and also additional sums directly over the years also lost all their money with the company's sudden collapse.

On 27 February 2024, with no prospect of the return of money to either lenders or investors, the administrators placed The House Crowd into liquidation.

== Recognition and awards ==
2017: Top 100 tech companies in Greater Manchester - Manchester Evening News.

2018: "Best Peer to Peer Lending Platform" - Shares Magazine Awards.
