= ChinICT =

Chinese tech conference

CHINICT - Tech Stars in China
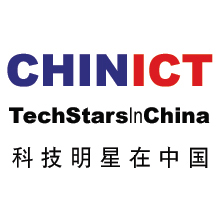
- Company type: Private
- Industry: Tech Conference
- Founded: 2005
- Founder: Franck Nazikian
- Headquarters: Beijing, China
- Website: www.chinict.org

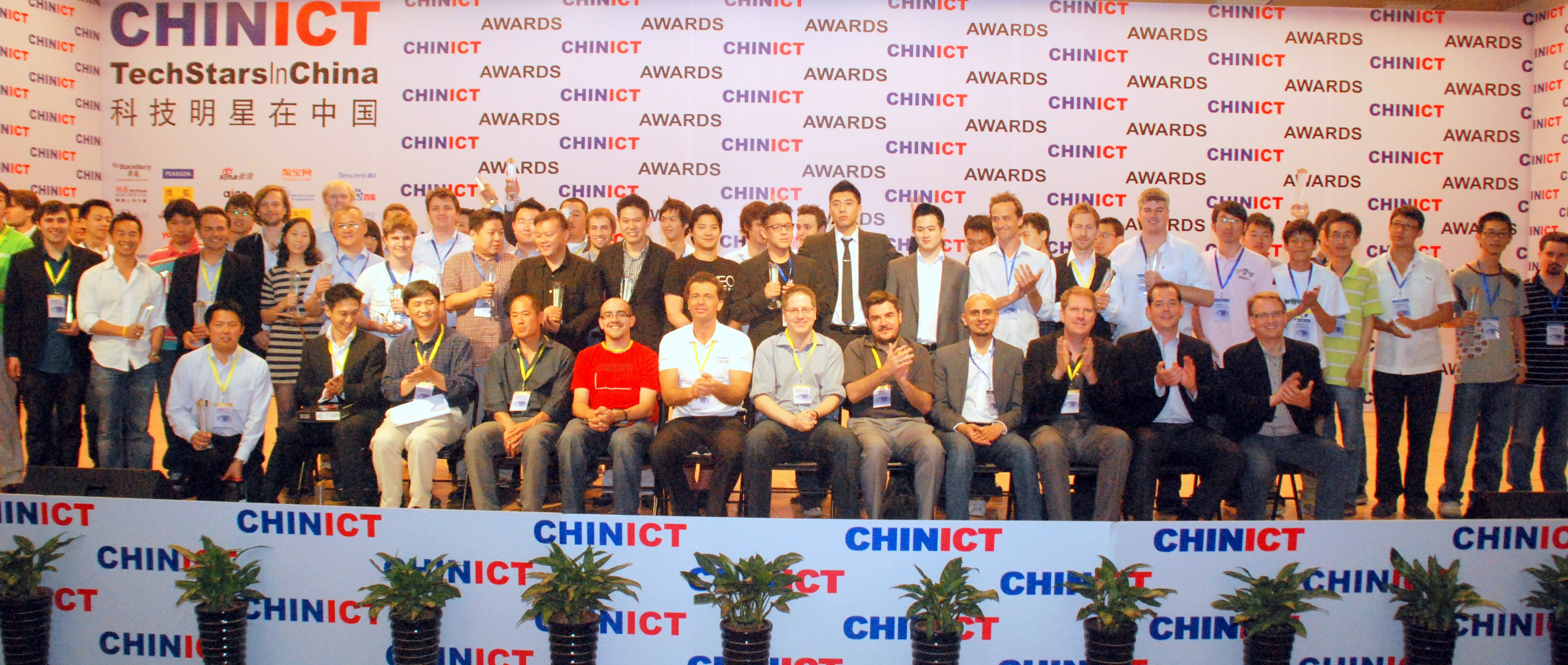
CHINICT's Stars, Rising Stars & Hackathon Award Winners

CHINICT (Simplified Chinese: 科技明星在中国 - literally meaning "Tech Stars In China") is a tech conference that includes a Hackathon and focuses on the China tech innovation and entrepreneurship ecosystem. CHINICT takes place once a year at the end of May in Beijing at Tsinghua University Science Park.

Since 2005, CHINICT has been featuring policymakers, financiers, entrepreneurs, innovators and technologists from both China and the West.

CHINICT was acquired by GSMA.

== Franck Nazikian ==
The conference was founded in 2005 by Franck Nazikian (Simplified Chinese: 方克纳), a tech entrepreneur and investor. He is the CEO and co-founder of WowTune, a company focused on creating VR singing and spoken voices, and several other Web3 enterprises. Together with Renaud Laplanche, Franck co-founded TripleHop Technologies, acquired by Oracle. Franck also served as a managing director at Gemplus International, making venture capital investments in tech companies, and runs DEVELOPNEUR, a series of pitch competitions and hackathons which he created in 2011.
