= Ezubao =

Chinese peer-to-peer lending scheme

Logo of Ezubao

Ezubao (Chinese: e租宝) was a peer-to-peer lending scheme based in the eastern Chinese province of Anhui. It was set up as an online scheme in July 2014, attracted funds of about 50 billion yuan ($7.6 billion) from 900,000 investors, and ceased to trade in December 2015. On 1 February 2016, the scheme was closed down and 21 involved people were arrested. Zhang Min, the president of the parent company, Yucheng Global, told investigators that the company operated as a Ponzi scheme.

== Ponzi scheme ==
Individuals who wanted to take part in the scheme invested their money in the expectation that the money would be lent to borrowers and repaid, with interest, over time. Investors would be matched with borrowers over the Internet. The scheme promised to pay investors around seven times the interest rates that could be obtained by depositing the money with a bank in the normal way, with interest rates of between 9% and 14.6% being promised.

The company sponsored the online broadcasts of the National People's Congress and placed advertisements on the state-run China Central Television, both of which gave people confidence in the scheme. Over a thousand sales agencies were established across the country to promote the scheme to the general public, and tens of thousands of customers were joining each week. Many of its customers were small investors from rural areas.

Several factors encouraged people to think the scheme was "approved" by the authorities: the prominent positioning of its ads just before the main evening CCTV news bulletin, its participation in the 12th China-Association of Southeast Asian Nations Expo, its announcement of the formation of a militia at an event attended by senior officials of the People's Liberation Army, and its doing business nationwide across China and in neighbouring Burma.

== Downfall ==
Ezubao unexpectedly stopped trading in December 2015. Worried customers started complaining and the police started investigating. The official Xinhua News Agency reported on 1 February 2016 that 21 people involved in the scheme had been arrested, including Ding Ning, chairman of the Yucheng Group. Chinese police reported that they were investigating the peer-to-peer lending company and had frozen and seized its assets, and those of the companies linked to it. The president of the parent company, Zhang Min, had told them that the company operated as a Ponzi scheme, with money from new investors used to pay money due to earlier investors; it is reported that about 50 billion yuan ($7.6 billion) had been invested in the scheme by about 900,000 investors. The authorities announced in early February that Ezubao clients could register their grievances on the web site of the Ministry of Public Security.

Xinhua reported that Ezubao had been under scrutiny since December 2015. An investigation into the company by local authorities had found that about 95% of the investments made were fake and that the purpose of the lending platform was to enrich senior executives. Chairman Ding Ning, for example, was reported to have recently spent $150 million on gifts, designer goods, luxury cars, and property. Xinhua further reported that, in an effort to conceal their fraudulent activities, the perpetrators had concealed 1,200 documents in 80 bags, and had buried these 6 m (20 ft) underground on the edge of the provincial capital, Hefei. The police had managed to unearth the documents after twenty hours of work with two excavators.

== Analytical commentary ==
Victor Shih, associate professor of Global Policy and Strategy at the University of California, San Diego commented: "The awkward truth is that Chinese regulators either knew about the scam and did nothing, or they completely missed the massive fraud". He added "Did provincial regulators know? They had to know".
