= 88 Kearny Street =

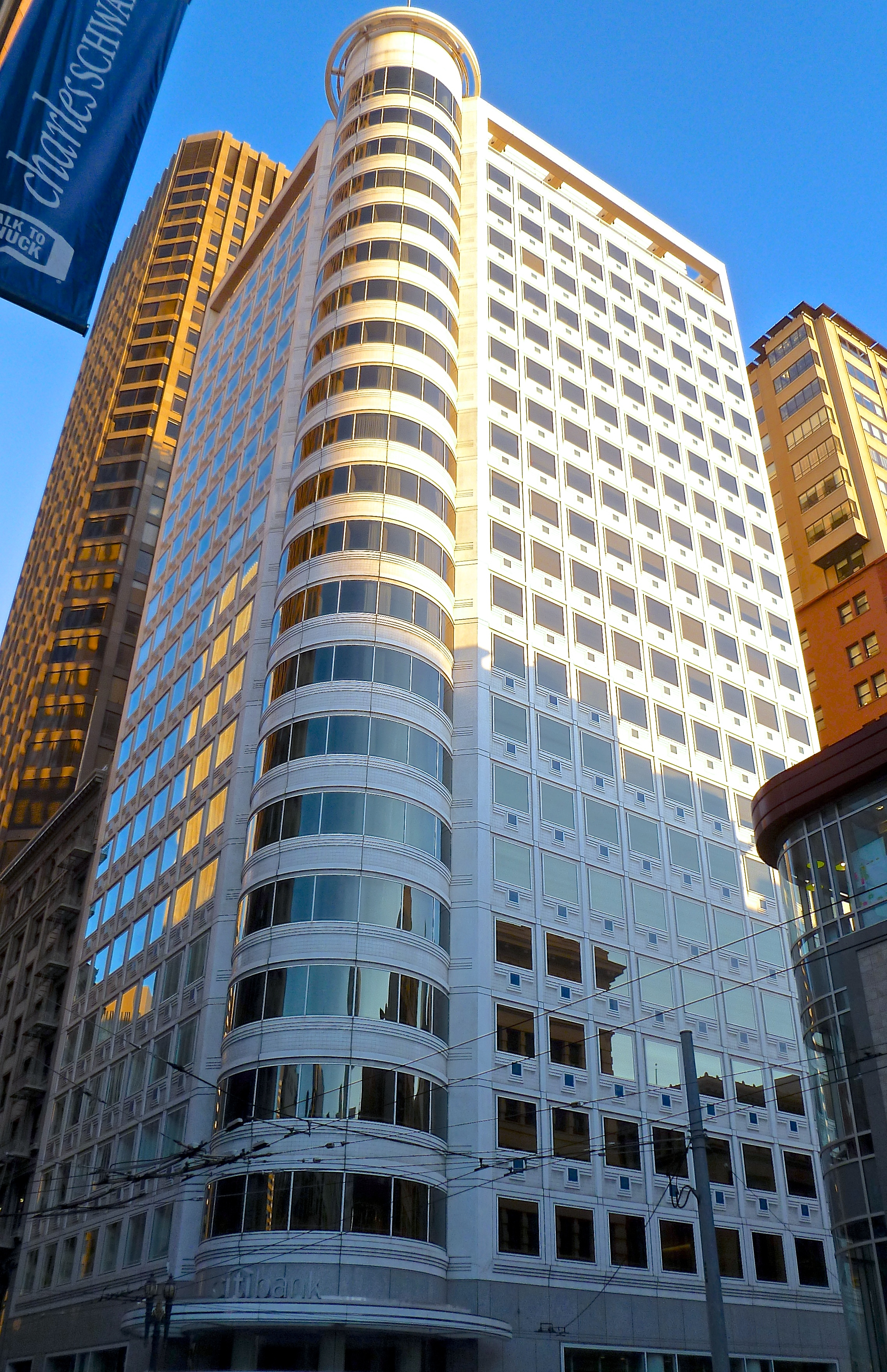
- In 2013

- Location within San Francisco
- Alternative names: California Federal Savings

General information
- Type: Commercial offices
- Location: 88 Kearny Street; San Francisco
- Coordinates: 37.788688°N 122.403477°W
- Completed: 1986
- Owner: TIAA-CREF

Height
- Roof: 309 ft (94 m)

Technical details
- Floor count: 22
- Lifts/elevators: 6

Design and construction
- Architect: Skidmore, Owings & Merrill

88 Kearny Street is a class-A office high-rise on Kearny Street at the southeast intersection with Post Street in the Financial District of San Francisco, California. The 309 ft (94 m), 22-story tower was designed by Skidmore, Owings & Merrill, and its construction was completed in 1986.

In April 2025, it was bought for $74.5 million by the financial services company LendingClub, to serve as its headquarters.

== See also ==
- List of tallest buildings in San Francisco
