= Betable =

Betable Ltd.
- Industry: Entertainment
- Genre: social gaming
- Founded: London, United Kingdom (2008)
- Founder: Christopher E. Griffin
- Headquarters: London, United Kingdom
- Key people: Christopher E. Griffin (CEO); Gaetano Crupi (COO); Ryan Linton (CRO); Michael Malone (CTO)
- Website: betable.com

Betable is a London-based company that develops and markets a real-money gambling platform for the social gaming industry. The company is licensed by the United Kingdom Gambling Commission and the Alderney Gambling Control Commission and is certified by third-party testing houses. The company has raised a total of $23 million in venture funding from, among others, Venture51, Greylock Partners, and Founders Fund.

== History ==
Christopher Griffin, the company’s current CEO, founded Betable in 2008. The first iteration of the service involved users creating betting opportunities and placing bets on a central, social-oriented gambling site. In July 2010 the company raised $3 million in seed funding from Atomico Ventures.

In 2012, Griffin re-capped the company and re-launched Betable from being a betting site to developing a real-money gambling platform. The Betable API beta program was released in July 2012, allowing game developers to integrate Betable betting features.

In October 2012, Betable partnered with game developers Slingo, Digital Chocolate, and Murka Games to incorporate betting into the developers' current offerings.

In November 2012, Mandala Games became the first European game developer to use the Betable platform, enabling real-money play in its title Slots by La Riviera.

In November 2013, Betable raised an $18.5 million Series A funding round led by Venture51.

=== TechCrunch April Fools' slot machine ===
On 1 April 2013, news website TechCrunch published a hoax article claiming that it would be launching a social betting game for venture capitalists to gamble at, remarking that it would be "an even easier way to bypass SEC regulations around being an accredited investor". The article included a TechCrunch-themed slot machine that was powered by Betable software.

== Products and services ==
Third-party game developers use the Betable API to apply real-money gambling functionality to mobile games. In addition to converting standard games (such as slots, blackjack, and roulette) into real-money gambling titles, the software can be used to create non-traditional types of gambling games that operate on top of the Betable platform. Once installed, Betable acts as a turnkey gaming engine that manages all real-money tasks within a game such as identity verification, anti-fraud safeguards, regulatory compliance, transactions, auditing, and gambling mechanics. The platform acts as an alternative to other forms of app monetization, such as banner ads or freemium models, by allowing developers to enable revenue-generating betting features within their games.

Because Betable possesses gambling licenses from the United Kingdom Gambling Commission that allow it to provide gambling services on another party's behalf, developers can enable betting within their games without applying for any licenses themselves. Betable is compatible with games on iOS and Android operating systems.

=== Battle Keno ===
One example of a traditional gaming title being converted to a real-money gambling app through Betable's platform is 30AK Gaming's Battle Keno, an adaptation of Battleship that financially rewards or penalizes players based on gameplay.

=== Prospect Hall Casino ===
In February 2015, Betable launched Prospect Hall Casino, a UK online gambling business with online casino games for mobile and web. The business is licensed and regulated by the United Kingdom Gambling Commission and the Alderney Gambling Control Commission.
