= Prosper Marketplace =

Peer-to-peer lending service

Prosper Marketplace, Inc.
- Type: Private
- Industry: Financial technology, Peer-to-peer lending
- Founded: California, USA (2005)
- Headquarters: San Francisco, CA
- Area served: United States
- Key people: David Kimball, CEO
- Products: personal loan; Home Equity Loan; Home equity line of credit; Credit Card
- Revenue: ▲US$ 173.36 million (2024)
- Net income: ▲US$ -54.08 million (2024)
- Total assets: ▼US$ 877.03 million (2024)
- Number of employees: 404
- Website: prosper.com

Prosper Marketplace, Inc. is a San Francisco, California-based financial services company that operates Prosper.com, a peer-to-peer lending platform. Founded in 2005, Prosper enables individuals to apply for personal loans, open credit cards, or invest in consumer credit through a marketplace model. The platform connects borrowers and investors directly, with the loan amounts ranging from $2,000 to $50,000. Since its launch, Prosper has facilitated over $23 billion in personal loans.

The company is structured around Prosper Funding LLC, which services loans and manages borrower and investor relationships. In addition to its core lending business, Prosper offers tools for financial planning and credit monitoring. In April 2025, Prosper entered a $500 million forward flow agreement with Fortress Investment Ground and Edge Focus to expand loan originations.

== History ==
Prosper opened to the public on February 5, 2006, and was founded by Chris Larsen (the founder of E-loan) and John Witchel. From 2006 to 2009, Prosper operated a variable rate model. Prosper acted as an eBay-style online auction marketplace, with lenders and borrowers ultimately determining loan rates using a Dutch auction-like system. Effective December 19, 2010, Prosper filed a new prospectus with the SEC, changing its business model to use pre-set rates determined solely by Prosper based on a formula evaluating each prospective borrower's credit risk.

Since its 2009 relaunch, Prosper received a Series D funding round of $14.7M in April 2010 with participation from all previous investors as well as new investors CompuCredit and TomorrowVentures. TomorrowVentures is an investment vehicle funded by Google Executive Chairman Eric Schmidt.

Bloomberg BusinessWeek reported on November 11, 2010, that Prosper was seeking additional funding and Prosper received an additional funding infusion in a Series E round on June 3, 2011. According to Prosper's SEC filing, the company raised $17.15 million by selling additional shares at an average of approximately $0.738/share. Series E investors included Draper Fisher Jurvetson, Crosslink Capital, Accel Partners, Agilus Ventures and TomorrowVentures.

In January 2013, Prosper received $20 million in funding led by Sequoia Capital, followed by $25 million in September 2013 led by Sequoia Capital and BlackRock. In May 2014, Prosper announced a $70 million funding round led by Francisco Partners. Credit Suisse's NEXT fund led an investment of $165 million in Prosper in April 2015. In 2017, Prosper raised US$50 million in a Series G round, led by FinEX Asia's private equity division.

In April 2025, Prosper entered into a $500 million forward flow agreement with Fortress Investment Group and Edge Focus. This partnership is designed to expand Prosper's personal loan marketplace by providing dedicated capital support loan originations.

== Prosper credit card ==
In 2022, Forbes gave a negative review of the Prosper credit card. According to Forbes, "Prospering with the Prosper® Card* seems unlikely... We hope you live long and… well, apply for a different credit card."

== Legal matters ==
=== SEC regulations ===
On November 24, 2008, the SEC found Prosper to be in violation of the Securities Act of 1933. As a result of these findings, the SEC imposed a cease and desist order on Prosper. Due primarily to the novel nature of the peer-to-peer lending models, the SEC, after review, now treats all peer-to-peer lending transactions as sales of securities and requires that all platforms register with the SEC.

In July 2009, Prosper reopened their website for lending ("investing") and borrowing after having obtained SEC registration for its loans ("notes"). After the relaunch, bidding on loans was restricted to residents of 28 U.S. states and the District of Columbia. Borrowers may reside in any of 47 states, with residents of three states (Iowa, Maine, and North Dakota) not permitted to borrow through Prosper.

=== Class-action lawsuit ===
On November 26, 2008, a class action lawsuit was filed against Prosper in the Superior Court of California, County of San Francisco, California. The suit was brought on behalf of all loan note purchasers in Prosper's online lending platform from January 1, 2006, through October 14, 2008, and alleges that Prosper offered and sold unqualified and unregistered securities in violation of the California and federal securities laws. The lawsuit seeks class certification, damages, the right of rescission and the award of attorneys’ fees.

Prosper's insurer, Greenwich Insurance Company, refused to pay for defense expenses, claiming the matters involved were not covered by the insurance policy. On December 14, 2010, Judge Richard A. Kramer of California Superior Court issued a tentative decision ruling for Prosper on this limited issue and holding that Greenwich is obligated to defend Prosper in the class-action suit and to reimburse Prosper's litigation expenses so far. Although the decision did not rule on the lawsuit itself or address whether Prosper might be entitled to insurance coverage in the event any of the lawsuit's claims proved meritorious, it relieved Prosper of significant legal expenses in the interim.

The lawsuit was settled July 19, 2013, for 10 million dollars paid in installments over three years.

=== Farook use of Prosper ===
In December 2015, the FBI reported that Syed Rizwan Farook, one of the shooters in the 2015 San Bernardino attack, had borrowed $28,500 from Prosper to finance the purchase of weapons and explosives. This was investigated by the FBI, the House Financial Services Committee, and the California Department of Business Oversight. The investigation was concluded with no action taken.

== 2025 Data breach ==
On 18 September 2025, Prosper announced that it had detected unauthorised access to their systems. According to cybersecurity researcher Troy Hunt from Have I Been Pwned?, the breach impacted 17.6 million unique email addresses as well as other customer data including dates of birth, names, credit status information, government issued IDs, IP addresses and physical addresses. Responding to an inquiry by The Register, Prosper stated it was not able to validate the claim made by Hunt, as their own investigation into the breach was still ongoing.

== See also ==
- Comparison of crowd funding services
