= MYC4 =

MYC4 A/S
- Company type: A/S
- Industry: Microcredit
- Founded: May 2006
- Defunct: June 1, 2019
- Headquarters: Copenhagen, Denmark
- Area served: Africa
- Key people: Mads Kjær (CEO); Tim Vang (Co-founder)
- Number of employees: 7
- Website: myc4.com

MYC4 A/S was a company that allowed its users to invest microcredits via an internet-platform in medium and small businesses in developing countries in Africa. On December 7, 2016, the MYC4 Foundation informed its investors it has decided to cease its activity and to liquidate as solvent. The MYC4 Foundation was the independent, non-profit entity, accepting funds from donors and holding investors’ money on escrow and separate from MYC4 A/S. The MYC4 platform has been closed as of June 1st 2019 and will not be reopened.

== History ==
MYC4 was founded as a joint venture in May 2006 by Mads Kjær, chairman and former CEO of the Kjær Group and Honorary Danish Consul to Ethiopia, and Tim Vang. MYC4 is currently headquartered in Copenhagen, Denmark with a regional office in Nairobi, Kenya. As of the beginning of 2011, it employed 7 people at its Danish office.

Between the company's creation to 2011, 19,073 investors from 115 countries had invested more than € 15 million in 8,334 businesses in seven African countries - Uganda, Kenya, Côte d'Ivoire, Rwanda, Ghana, Senegal and Tanzania.

Annual reports and up-to-date statistics are available.

== Method of operation ==
African businesses would apply for a loan at a local credit provider, partnering with MYC4. They would specify the amount of money they needed, the interest they were willing to pay and the a time period for repayment.

Investors who created accounts on the website could choose from these third-world businesses, which they then bid money towards supporting. They would specify an amount, a target interest rate and a minimum interest rate. This process is known as a Dutch auction method and guarantees that the interest rate will be as low as possible, depending on the investor bids. Depending on the amount of money offered by investors, and the interest rates, individual bids could proceed at the target or a lower interest rate, or be cancelled. A bid could be as little as €5, and repayment times were usually 6 to 12 months, sometimes 2 years. Providers, Administrators and MYC4 itself all charge a fee for their services. They vary, but they are stated on each loan, in order to create transparency.

== Major investments ==
In December 2006, MYC4 received a €670,000 grant from the Danish Aid Agency under the Danish Ministry of Foreign Affairs.

On 29 October 2008, The Industrialisation Fund for Developing Countries (IFU) decided to invest approximately €1.3 million in Africa through MYC4. The Minister for Development Cooperation of Denmark Ulla Tørnæs supports the decision.

== Risks ==
As any investment, lending money via MYC4 carries risk. In the past, a significant number of loans defaulted, making investments effectively donations. After major restructuring, it was hoped that losses will reduce. As a result of this, the first quarterly report released in 2012 showed a portfolio risk that was the lowest in two years. This shows a net return for investors of -0.1%.

The forum, where investors could discuss issues, was disabled in October 2010, being replaced with a blog by the organizers.

== Liquidation ==
On December 7, 2016, the MYC4 Foundation - via its liquidator - informed investors it has decided to cease its activity and to liquidate as solvent. Also the former board of directors of MYC4 Foundation came to the conclusion that there was no reason to maintain the MYC4 Foundation as an independent institution with its cost structure as the obtainable debt collections is coming to an end. Investors can withdraw their balance or donate their balance for distribution in accordance with the bylaws for MYC4 Foundation. The bylaws of the MYC4 foundation is stating that in case of liquidation the Foundations funds/donations shall be used for activities, which support the aims and objectives of the UNITED NATIONS concerning the extirpation of poverty. The MYC4 platform has been closed as of June 1st 2019 and will not be reopened.

== See also ==
- Microcredit
- Person-to-person lending
- Social entrepreneurship
- Kiva
