= Alderney Gambling Control Commission =

Regulatory body in the Bailiwick of Guernsey

Alderney Gambling Control Commission (AGCC), established in May 2000, is an independent, non-political body regulating eGambling on behalf of the States of Alderney. It ensures its regulatory approach meets the highest international standards, with a mission to maintain integrity and fairness in online gambling. The commission seeks all aspects of online gambling services to be delivered in accordance with high industry standards, based on the principles of honesty. These aspects include such issues as funding, gains pay offs, software performed processes, etc. The commission claims to protect players' interests from any kind of criminal influence. The Commission is chaired by Lord Faulkner of Worcester.
