= Funding Circle =

Commercial lender

Funding Circle Limited
- Type: Public
- Traded as: LSE: FCH
- Industry: Financial technology
- Founded: August 2010; 16 years ago
- Founder: Samir Desai, CEO; James Meekings; Andrew Mullinger
- Headquarters: Queen Victoria Street, London, EC4
- Area served: UK, United States, Germany, Netherlands
- Key people: Andrew Learoyd, Chairman; Lisa Jacobs (CEO)
- Products: Business loan Commercial and industrial loan
- Revenue: ▲£222.5 million (2025)
- Operating income: ▲£20.3 million (2025)
- Net income: ▲£46.0 million (2025)
- Website: www.fundingcircle.com

Funding Circle is a British financial technology company specialising in providing loans and financial services to small and medium-sized enterprises (SMEs). Founded in 2010 as a peer-to-peer lending platform, the company transitioned fully to institutional lending in 2022.

As of 31 December 2025, Funding Circle has extended more than £17 billion in loans. It is listed on the London Stock Exchange and is a constituent of the FTSE 250 Index.

== History ==
=== 2010–13; Founding ===
Samir Desai, James Meekings and Andrew Mullinger, friends from University of Oxford, first discussed the idea of a peer-to-peer lending marketplace in a public house in 2008.

The meeting occurred during the 2007-09 financial crisis, a period in Britain when the banks were cutting back on "lending to strengthen their balance sheets and meet regulatory demands".

In 2009 Desai, Meekings and Mullinger quit their jobs to co-found the company that would be launched in August 2010 under the name Funding Circle.

Initially, the company operated as a peer-to-peer lending platform. In 2012 the British government used the platform to lend 20 million pounds ($32 million) to small businesses. From launching in 2010 to October 2013 Funding Circle had facilitated £160 million of loans.

=== 2013–15; Expansion through merging and acquisition ===
In 2013, Funding Circle raised $37 million in funding led by Accel Partners, with additional participation from Ribbit Capital, Union Square Ventures and Index Ventures, increasing the company's total funding to $58 million. This capital raise supported Funding Circle's entry into the US market.

In October 2015, Funding Circle acquired Zencap, enabling it to enter markets in Germany, Spain and the Netherlands. In September 2018, the global asset management firm Alcentra agreed to purchase up to $1 billion worth of business loans from Funding Circle's US platform on behalf of its clients. Financed by Credit Suisse, the deal was expected to provide funding to approximately 8,000 US businesses over a three-year period.

=== 2018; Initial public offering ===
Funding Circle was listed on the London Stock Exchange in September 2018, raising around £300 million at an initial valuation of £1.5 billion. Danish billionaire Anders Povlsen, owner of Bestseller, anchored the offering by agreeing to purchase at least 10% of the available shares. However, shares fell 24% on the first day of trading.

=== 2019–present; Since becoming a public company ===
Funding Circle reported its first financial results as a public company in 2019, showing a 55% year-on-year increase in revenues but also an increase in pre-tax losses from £36.3 million to £50.7 million. These increased losses were attributed primarily to higher spending on marketing and staffing.

In April 2019, the Funding Circle SME Income Fund announced it would wind itself up and return capital to shareholders. The company subsequently experienced slower revenue growth, citing an uncertain economic environment in July 2019. Media reports linked this slowdown to broader economic uncertainty associated with Brexit rather than fundamental issues with Funding Circle's business model. In August 2019, the company announced that first-half losses had increased by 15%, primarily due to rising bad debts in the UK.

By September 2019, liquidity issues arose, with the Press Association reporting that lenders faced waits of almost 100 days to sell unwanted loans, compared to eight days earlier that year. In October 2019, Funding Circle addressed investor concerns by issuing a communication to clarify the situation. Later in November, Funding Circle's IPO was highlighted in media reports as an example of the broader difficulties faced by UK listings in 2019.

=== 2020–present: Shift to institutional lending ===
On 9 April 2020, Funding Circle temporarily suspended its secondary market for loan parts, citing uncertainty caused by the COVID-19 pandemic as the reason for the suspension.

On 10 March 2022, Funding Circle announced its permanent exit from peer-to-peer lending, shifting its focus entirely toward institutional commercial lending. In July 2024, the company sold its US operations to iBusiness Funding, allowing it to concentrate exclusively on its UK market and products.

October 2024 saw co-founder Samir Desai step down from the board, marking the departure of the last original founder. Lisa Jacobs, who joined Funding Circle in 2012 and became CEO in 2022, continues to lead the company through its ongoing transformation and strategic growth.

In 2024, Funding Circle sold its American arm and made job cuts in an attempt to stem losses and aid its poorly-performing share price.

== Operations ==
Funding Circle provides business loans and financial products exclusively to small and medium-sized enterprises (SMEs) in the UK.

In addition to traditional business loans, Funding Circle introduced new financial products, including FlexiPay in 2021, a flexible line of credit up to £250,000 designed to help SMEs manage cash flow. Businesses using FlexiPay can make immediate supplier payments and repay over 1, 3, 6, 9 or 12 months. In 2024, Funding Circle processed £492 million in FlexiPay transactions — averaging just over £40 million in monthly payments.

In September 2024, Funding Circle launched the Cashback Business Credit Card, offering SMEs 2% cashback on all business spending for the first six months (up to £2,000), and 1% unlimited cashback thereafter. The card provides up to £250,000 in credit, with no monthly fees and up to 42 days interest-free.

== Partnerships ==
In April 2025, Funding Circle extended its partnership with Bayview Asset Management, LLC, surpassing £1 billion in total funding.

In February 2024, Funding Circle formed a lending partnership with Barclays Bank and TPG Angelo Gordon, aiming to deploy up to £300 million to UK small businesses through its platform.

== Regulatory ==
Funding Circle is regulated by the UK's Financial Conduct Authority (FCA).
