= E-Loan =

American financial services company

Coordinates: 41.980866°N 87.864031°W

E-LOAN, Inc.
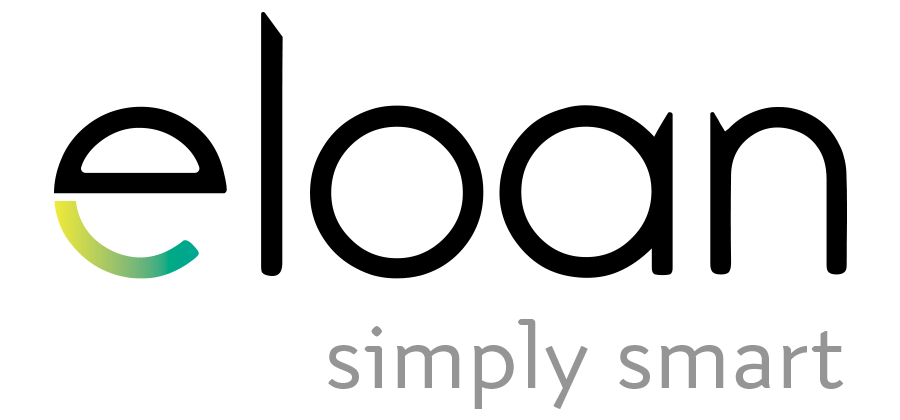
- Type: Public
- Industry: Financial services
- Founded: 1997
- Founder: Janina Pawlowski and Chris Larsen
- Headquarters: New York, New York, U.S.
- Key people: Ignacio Alvarez; (CEO); Richard Carrión; (Executive Chairman); Camille Burckhart; (CIO)
- Products: Referral to partners for Loan products
- Number of employees: Part of Popular, Inc., which has 8,000 employees
- Parent: Popular, Inc.
- Website: www.eloan.com

E-Loan, Inc. is a financial services company that offers its users access to partners that may be able to assist them in obtaining loans.

E-Loan was a pioneer in the online lending industry in the late 1990s and early 2000s. As of 1999, it was the number one site for online lending, with Quicken Loan's later online offering playing catch-up in second after E-Loan declined a buyout offer.

As of 2017, E-Loan is focused on its personal loan referral business, and as of May 15, 2017 all of its deposit customers were transferred to Popular Direct.

E-Loan is a division of Banco Popular de Puerto Rico.

== History ==
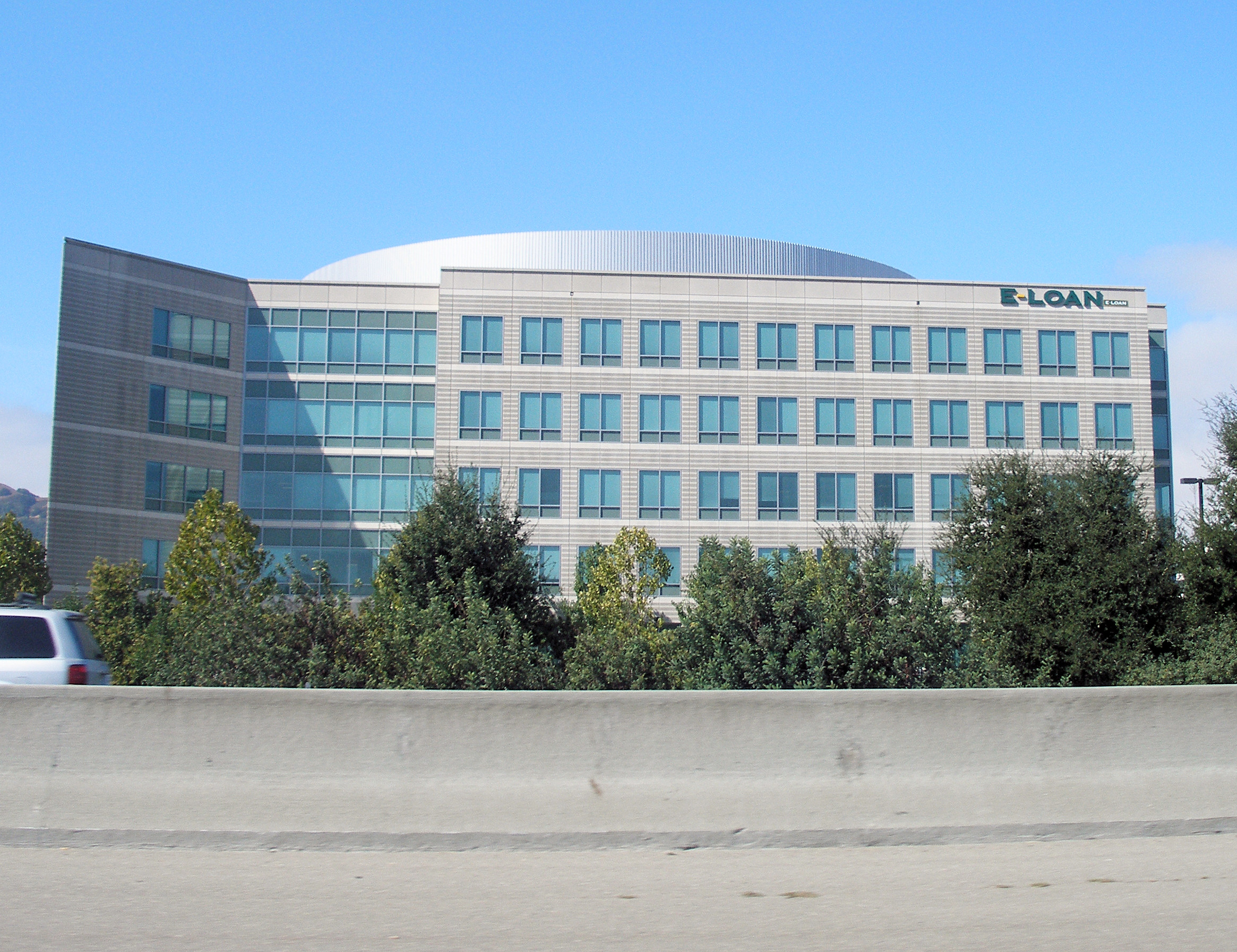
Former E-Loan headquarters in Pleasanton, California

E-Loan was founded by Janina Pawlowski and Christopher Larsen in 1997. Former co-workers at a California-based mortgage lender, Pawlowski and Larsen had disagreed with their supervisor's on-the-job demands and decided to build their own mortgage business together. They took a chance on creating an online-based lending service, just as the Internet became ubiquitous. At the time, E-Loan's services included purchase and refinance mortgage loans, home equity loans, home equity lines of credit, and auto loans.

== Growth ==
By mid-1997, the website, www.eloan.com, was launched. At the time it was the pioneer in online mortgage lending, with a Radically Simple value proposition at the time.

In 1998, declining interest rates boosted mortgage originations to $1.5 billion, a 70% increase. Online loans increased only by $4.2 billion. However, at the time, E-Loan controlled 25% of the online lending market, making it the number-one online mortgage business in the world. E-Loan received $25.4 million in venture capital funding from Sequoia Capital, Yahoo Inc., and Softbank Holdings Inc.

== Yahoo Investment ==
By August 1998, E-Loan needed a capital injection to secure growth. The online lender was burning through $250,000 per month as it tried to retain 150 employees. The founders met with Intuit Corp, which offered $130 million to acquire E-Loan. The deal would net Pawlowski and Larsen $10 million each and give them $16 million in Intuit stock. However, as part of the acquisition, E-Loan shifted from an autonomous company to having a board of trustees in charge of the decision making.

In August 1998, Pawlowski approached Yahoo and negotiated to sell 23% of E-Loan for $25 million. Though the offer was substantially less profitable than the Intuit deal, it effectively maintained E-Loan's autonomy. It also made E-Loan Yahoo's preferred mortgage site.

== Recovery & Development ==
In 2002, E-Loan established its headquarters in Pleasanton, California. It also created the E-loan Auto Fund One, a qualified special purpose entity that purchased prime auto loans from E-Loan and then held them. For this entity, E-Loan secured a $540 million auto loan credit facility with Merrill Lynch. During this time, E-Loan's revenues from sales consisted of discounted cash flows, net of interest, service fees, and credit losses.

E-Loan started using proprietary and commercially available licensed technology from fintech providers like Sun Microsystems, Cisco Systems, and Oracle. E-Loan also began using automated credit filters and proprietary underwriting engine to lower the cost of the loan origination process. The use of licensed technology effectively helped bolster E-Loan's growth and reputation within the mortgage lending industry.

In 2003, E-Loan formed Escrow Closing Services, Inc., a wholly owned subsidiary that provides mortgage closing services such as documentation preparation and signing, disbursement, and recording services. In 2004, E-Loan originated more than $5 billion in mortgage loans. Most of those loans were fixed rate, and 70% were lines of credit. By the end of 2004, it employed 930 employees, had $121 million in assets, and $86 million in stockholder's equity. It generated $135 million in annual revenue, and $822,000 in net income.

As of 2004, 17% of the company's shares were owned by insiders. The largest shareholder, at 5.05%, was Christian Larsen, following by Harold Bonnikson at 1.28% and Matthew J. Roberts at .85%. In 2004, 38% of the company was owned by institutional holders. The largest institutional shareholders were Second Curve Capital at 7.77%, Wells Fargo & Co. at 5.11%, American Century Investment Mgmt at 2.11%, Rice, Hall, James, & Associates at 1.82%, and Gruber & McBaine Capital Management at 1.63%.

== Banco Popular Acquisition ==
In August 2005, the Puerto Rico-based commercial bank, Banco Popular, acquired E-Loan for $300 million. Banco Popular's parent company, Popular Inc., known for being the largest financial institution in Puerto Rico had $46 billion in assets, more than 135 branches in the U.S., and more than 280 branches in Puerto Rico at the time it purchased E-Loan.

The goal of the acquisition was to increase E-Loan's access to financial holdings, and therefore, its loan production capacity. With this increased lending capacity, both Popular and E-Loan sought to capitalize on a cost advantage through economies of scale.

In October 2008, E-Loan's parent company, Popular, Inc. said E-Loan would no longer operate as a direct mortgage lender in 2009, but would continue to provide certificates of deposit and savings accounts. Operational, general and administrative support functions would be transferred to other Popular subsidiaries. The company subsequently moved its headquarters in 2009 from Pleasanton, California to Rosemont, Illinois.

Company officials said customers who have already obtained loans through E-Loan would not be affected as they were transitioned to another subsidiary of Popular.

== Development After the Acquisition ==
In May 2017, E-Loan deposit products transitioned to Popular Direct products. Both E-Loan and Popular Direct are owned and operated by Banco Popular North America.

== Awards ==
Since its inception, E-Loan has garnered various awards for privacy and ease-of-use:

- Web Marketing Association's Web Awards Financial Services Standard of Excellence Award (2013)
- New Media Awards Standard of Excellence Award (2013)
- Interactive Media Award’s (IMA) Best In Class in the Banking Category (October 2013)
- Top Financial Company for Privacy by TRUSTe and the Ponemon Institute (April 2007)
- Ranked #3 in Privacy by The Customer Respect Group (August 2005) E-Loan was the only financial services company and the highest ranking online company to make the top ten.
- Safest Places On the Web (2005). Computer World
