= Zopa =

British financial services company

Zopa Bank Ltd.
- Type: Private
- Industry: Personal financial services
- Founded: March 2005; 21 years ago
- Founders: Richard Duvall; James Alexander; Giles Andrews; David Nicholson; Tim Parlett
- Headquarters: Level 12, 20 Water Street, Canary Wharf, London, United Kingdom
- Key people: Jaidev Janardana (CEO)
- Products: P2P lending, retail banking
- Revenue: ▲£303.4 million (2024)
- Net income: ▲£34.2 million (2024)
- Website: www.zopa.com

Zopa Bank Ltd. (/ˈzoʊpə/) is a British online bank which offers deposit accounts, personal loans and credit cards. It began as the world's first peer-to-peer lending company in 2005 and gained a full banking licence in 2020. The peer-to-peer side of its business closed in December 2021.

== History ==
Zopa was launched in the UK in March 2005 as an arranger of peer-to-peer lending, connecting investors with individuals seeking loans. It was founded in Buckinghamshire in 2004 by a team from the internet banking company Egg Banking.

Zopa grew steadily in the years prior to the 2008 financial crisis. It navigated the period with no losses to investors' capital and only a small dip in returns during 2008.

In September 2016, the first portfolio of Zopa loans was securitised on the European markets.

In January 2017, Zopa became the first UK based peer-to-peer lending company to lend more than £2 billion worth of loans. Zopa became fully regulated by the Financial Conduct Authority in May 2017. Following FCA authorisation, and HMRC approval as an Individual Savings Account (ISA) manager, Zopa started offering Innovative Finance ISA products in June 2017.

In November 2016, Zopa announced its intention to apply for a banking licence so it could expand the range of financial products it offers to UK consumers. In August 2018, Zopa obtained £44 million in funding for the launch of its new digital challenger bank. In December 2018 the company was awarded interim banking licences by the UK financial regulators, the FCA and PRA.

Retail banking services – including deposit accounts and a credit card – were launched in June 2020, soon after a full banking licence was awarded. By March 2021, Zopa had attracted around £250m in fixed-term savings accounts and had become a "top ten" credit card issuer. In the same month, the company raised £20m further capital from its existing lenders.

In June 2021, CEO Jaidev Janardana stated that Zopa could be taken public as early as the last quarter of 2022. In October of that year, the company raised $300 million from Softbank Vision Fund and other investors, implying a $1 billion valuation. A further £75m was raised from existing investors, not including Softbank, in early 2023.

In December 2021, Zopa announced it would be winding up the peer-to-peer side of its business, including buying back the existing loans of investors.

In early 2023, Zopa had around 850,000 customers, over £3 billion in deposits and £2 billion on loan. The company indicated that it expected to make a profit over the full year for the first time in its history.

In February 2023, it was announced Zopa had acquired the Newcastle-under-Lyme-headquartered, 'buy now, pay later’ (BNPL) platform DivideBuy.

In December 2024, Zopa raised $87 million in equity at a valuation exceeding $1 billion, prioritizing profitability and growth over an IPO amidst a sluggish tech IPO market.

In May 2026, Zopa became the first UK bank to receive regulatory approval to provide targeted support under the Financial Conduct Authority's framework for addressing the financial advice gap.

== Products and services ==
=== Peer-to-peer lending ===
Zopa enabled investors to lend to UK consumers through its peer-to-peer lending platform. By 2021, around £6 billion in loans had been processed. Borrowers could take out loans between £1,000 and £25,000. Typically individuals used these funds to help buy a car, consolidate debts, cover home improvements or weddings.

Investors could choose from four investment products based on their risk and return appetite. Investors' money was split across multiple borrowers. Investors then received monthly repayments of interest and capital, which they could re-lend to compound the interest.

In December 2021, Zopa announced that it would withdraw from peer-to-peer lending.

=== Banking and credit cards ===
Zopa offers FSCS-protected deposit accounts, personal loans, credit cards, and a money management app which makes use of data made available by the introduction of Open Banking. A current account, branded "Biscuit", was launched in March 2025. Zopa's Biscuit account can be used alongside accounts held with other banks, which customers can link to view within the Zopa app. As of November 2026, Zopa stated that customers could open only one of its current accounts at a time. Investment accounts followed in November 2025, offering the ability to invest in two ready made mutual funds run by Invesco.

== Corporate identity ==
The company moved their main office to Canary Wharf in 2025. Since 2017, Zopa also has a development centre in Barcelona, Spain.

The company's name comes from "zone of possible agreement", a negotiating term identifying the bounds within which agreement can be reached between two parties.

== See also ==
- Comparison of crowd funding services
- Neobanks in Europe
- Peer-to-peer lending
