= Happen Bank =

American financial services company

Happen Inc.
- Type: Public
- Traded as: Nasdaq: HAPN
- Industry: Financial services
- Founded: 2006; 20 years ago
- Founders: Renaud Laplanche; Soul Htite
- Headquarters: 88 Kearny Street; San Francisco
- Key people: Scott Sanborn (CEO & president)
- Services: Peer-to-peer lending; Fintech
- Revenue: ▲US$999 million (2025)
- Operating income: ▲US$177 million (2025)
- Net income: ▲US$136 million (2025)
- Total assets: ▲US$11.6 billion (2025)
- Total equity: ▲US$1.50 billion (2025)
- Number of employees: 1,075 (2025)
- Subsidiaries: Happen Bank
- Website: happen.com

Happen Bank Inc. (formerly LendingClub Corporation) is an American financial services company headquartered in San Francisco, California. It was the first peer-to-peer lender to register its offerings as securities with the Securities and Exchange Commission (SEC), and to offer loan trading on a secondary market. At its height, LendingClub was the world's largest peer-to-peer lending platform.

Happen Bank (then LendingClub) raised $1 billion in what became the largest technology IPO of 2014 in the United States. Though viewed as a pioneer in the fintech industry and one of the largest such firms, Happen Bank experienced problems in early 2016, with difficulties in attracting investors, a scandal over some of the firm's loans and concerns by the board over CEO Renaud Laplanche's disclosures leading to a large drop in its share price and Laplanche's resignation.

== History ==
Happen Inc., which was founded as LendingClub in 2006, was initially launched on Facebook as one of Facebook's first applications. After receiving $10.26 million in a Series A funding round in August 2007, from venture capital investors Norwest Venture Partners and Canaan Partners, LendingClub was developed into a full-scale peer-to-peer lending company.

On April 8, 2008, LendingClub temporarily suspended new lender registration, canceled its affiliate program and entered a "quiet period" while it awaited approval to issue promissory notes to lenders. On June 20, 2008, LendingClub filed an S-1 statement with the U.S. Securities and Exchange Commission (SEC) seeking the registration of $600 million in "Member Payment Dependent Notes" to be issued on its website. On August 1, 2008, LendingClub filed an amendment to its Form S-1 outlining new interest rate formulas as well as more details on a "resale trading system". On October 14, 2008, LendingClub announced its completion of the SEC registration process, posted the filed prospectus on its website, and resumed new lender registration. Notes issued on or after October 14, 2008 represent LendingClub securities rather than direct obligations of the ultimate borrower and are tradable (can be bought and sold) on the Foliofn trading platform. In March 2009, LendingClub raised $12 million in a Series B funding round led by Morgenthaler Ventures.

=== Pre-IPO growth ===
In April 2010, the company raised $24.5 million in a Series C funding led by Foundation Capital and joined by existing investors including Morgenthaler Ventures, Norwest Venture Partners and Canaan Partners.

In August 2011, LendingClub raised an additional $25 million in venture capital from Union Square Ventures and Thomvest, owned by the Thomson family of Thomson-Reuters. This led to LendingClub earning a $275 million post-money valuation and an increase of $80 million in valuation from the preceding year. Thomson-Reuters founder Peter J. Thomson also invested an unspecified amount of his personal fortune into LendingClub. In fall 2011, LendingClub's headquarters moved to downtown San Francisco; its earlier offices were located in Sunnyvale and Redwood City. Co-founder Soul Htite moved to China to start Dianrong.com, a peer-to-peer lending company based in Shanghai.

In 2012, the company employed about 80 people, with Renaud Laplanche continuing as the company CEO and chairman of the Board of Directors. The company averaged about $1.5 million in loan originations daily, with a total of $600 million since its founding. In April 2012, LendingClub's SEC registration from 2008 was renewed for $1 billion USD in Member Payment Dependent Notes and became effective on April 10, 2012. In June 2012, the company received $15 million in new funding from Kleiner Perkins Caufield & Byers and $2.5 million of personal investments from John J. Mack. Kleiner Perkins partner Mary Meeker joined Mack on LendingClub's board of directors. This led to a $570 million valuation of the company. In November 2012, LendingClub surpassed $1 billion in loans issued since inception and announced they were now cash flow positive.

In May 2013, Google Capital purchased a stake in LendingClub. LendingClub also began partnering with smaller banks in order to help streamline their small loans operations. In June 2013 the company partnered with Titan Bank in Texas and Congressional Bank in Maryland in order to help them facilitate loans that would have been otherwise unprofitable for them. In March 2014, LendingClub began providing loans to small businesses. In April 2014 LendingClub acquired Springstone Financial.

=== Initial public offering (IPO) ===
On August 27, 2014, LendingClub filed for an IPO with the SEC, the offering taking place in December 2014. On December 10, 2014, the company raised almost $900 million in the largest U.S. tech IPO of 2014. The stock ended the first trading day up 56%, valuing the company at $8.5bn.

88 Kearny Street, San Francisco, the location of Happen Bank headquarters

=== Business expansion ===
Laplanche told Forbes in April 2015 that LendingClub would expand into car loans and mortgages. LendingClub also announced a partnership with Google to extend credit to smaller companies that use Google's business services. The company signed partnerships with Google, Alibaba.com, BancAlliance, and HomeAdvisor, including vetting community bank lenders for BancAlliance (a group of 200 banks), in order to send people on its platform to various community finance institutions. That year LendingClub partnered with Opportunity Fund, announced by former President Bill Clinton at the Clinton Global Initiative. The partnership intended to provide $10 million to small businesses in areas of California that are underserved by lenders. LendingClub and other small business lenders partnered with Sam’s Club to deliver its “business lending center” product.

=== Scandal and struggle, 2016-2017 ===
Like other peer-to-peer lenders including Prosper, Sofi, and Khutzpa.com, LendingClub experienced increasing difficulty attracting investors during early 2016. This led the firm to increase the interest rate it charged borrowers on three occasions during the first months of the year. The increase in interest rates and concerns over the impact of the slowing United States economy caused a large drop in LendingClub's share price.

In April 2016, a LendingClub employee reported to Laplanche that the dates on approximately $US 3 million in the firm's loans appeared to have been altered. LendingClub's internal auditor engaged an outside firm to investigate the report. This investigation found additional problems with loans, including that $US 22 million in loans which had been sold to the Jefferies investment bank did not in fact meet the bank's investment criteria. LendingClub bought these loans back from the bank and resold them.

The New York Times reported that the investigation found that Laplanche had not disclosed to the board that he owned part of an investment fund which LendingClub was considering purchasing. The Wall Street Journal also stated that Laplanche was found to have not fully disclosed what he knew about the problematic loans.

On May 6, LendingClub's board made it clear to Laplanche that he no longer had their confidence, leading to his resignation on 9 May. The Wall Street Journal reported that Laplanche had been fired by the board. Three of the firm's other managers had also been fired or had resigned by that time as a result of the problematic loans. LendingClub's stock price fell by a further 34 percent after Laplanche's departure was announced. This placed the stock price at 70 percent of the price at the time of the firm's initial public offering. As a result of the incident, the Securities and Exchange Commission was reported to be investigating LendingClub's disclosures to investors.

In December 2017, the Financial Times reported that LendingClub "has struggled to overcome the effects of a governance scandal last May", and that the firm "has battled to keep big investors buying loans" despite improvements to its internal governance. These challenges led the company to raise its loss estimate, which led to further drops in its share price.

=== End of P2P platform, 2019-2020 ===
In an interview with Business Insider in December 2019, executive Valerie Kay noted that LendingClub had switched its focus to institutional investors through a new project called "Scale", focused on delivering representative samples of loans instead of individual loans - labeled its "Select" program. LendingClub had grown to $10.8 billion in annual loan originations in the year 2018.

In April 2020, the company announced it would lay off around one third of its employees in anticipation of the economic downturn resulting from the COVID-19 pandemic.

In October 2020, the company ceased all new loan accounts on their website as part of restructuring into a neobank after the acquisition of Radius Bank. By the end of the year, the company ceased to operate as a peer-to-peer lender.

=== Acquisition and rebranding 2020- ===
In February 2020 LendingClub announced that it had agreed to buy Radius Bank for $185 million in cash and stock. The deal was the first time since the 2008 financial crisis that a U.S. "fintech" lender bought a regulated bank. In 2021, Radius was integrated into the LendingClub brand.

Radius had been founded in 1987 as First Trade Union Bank by the carpenters union in Massachusetts, using pension funds. The bank, however, struggled during the subprime mortgage crisis, when it invested heavily in commercial real estate. In 2014, it was renamed Radius Bank. In June 2016, private investors had acquired approximately 95% of Radius Bancorp in response to Dodd Frank regulations.

In April 2025, LendingClub bought the 88 Kearny Street building in San Francisco's Financial District for $74.5 million, to serve as its headquarters.

In June 2026, LendingClub rebranded to Happen Bank. As part of its rebrand, the newly renamed company migrated from the New York Stock Exchange to the Nasdaq, trading under the ticker symbol HAPN

== Peer-to-peer business model ==
=== Overview ===
LendingClub enabled borrowers to create loan listings on its website by supplying details about themselves and the loans that they would like to request. All loans were unsecured personal loans. The company facilitated interest rates that were better for lenders and borrowers than they would receive from most banks. It averaged between a six and nine percent return to investors between its founding and 2013.

After the notes were issued, LendingClub purchased the loans from the issuing bank and notes became the obligations of LendingClub, and not of the ultimate borrower: LendingClub has promised to pay the noteholder monies it receives from the borrower less its service fees, while the holders of LendingClub notes have the status of unsecured creditors of LendingClub. This means that there is a risk that the investor may lose all or part of the investment if LendingClub becomes insolvent or declares bankruptcy, even if the ultimate borrower continues to pay.

As of 2016, a high proportion of funds for LendingClub-facilitated loans came from hedge funds. During May of that year, LendingClub was seeking to sell hundreds of millions of dollars' worth of loans as bonds as part of a strategy to overcome difficulties in accessing sufficient funding.

To reduce default risk, LendingClub focuses on high-credit-worthy borrowers, declining approximately 90% of the loan applications it received as of 2012. The average returns of investment for LendingClub lenders are between 5.47% and 10.22%, with 23 straight quarters of positive returns as of the second quarter of 2013.

== Banking services ==
LendingClub operates an online-focused community bank headquartered in Lehi, Utah. LendingClub is a member of the FDIC and an Equal Housing Lender as well as a member of the NYCE SUM ATM network.

=== Consumer banking ===
LendingClub formerly had one physical banking branch located in Boston when it was operating as Radius Bank. Customers have access to online banking and mobile apps available for iOS and Android devices and offers free ATM reimbursements worldwide.

=== Partnerships ===
The bank launched its first fintech partnership with LevelUp in 2013. This was followed by a partnership with Prosper to provide personal loans in 2015.

Radius Bank launched another fintech partnership in July 2015 with Aspiration.

=== Commercial banking ===
LendingClub Bank provides depository services and financing to small and middle market businesses. The bank has been a Small Business Administration (SBA) Lender since 2009, primarily focused on lending in the northeast region of the U.S. In May 2016, the bank expanded its SBA lending program nationally with the establishment of a new government-guaranteed lending team. In December 2016, the bank acquired the equipment financing division of NewStar Financial.

=== API Banking ===
On 29 October 2020, the bank has progressed its partnership with the Treasury Prime application programming interface (API) with the roll-out of its Business API Banking Software and sandbox testing technology.

== See also ==
- Comparison of crowdfunding services
- Disintermediation
