= Peer-to-peer lending =

Practice of lending money

Peer-to-peer lending (P2P lending) is the practice of lending money to individuals or businesses through online services that match lenders with borrowers. Peer-to-peer lending companies often offer their services online, and attempt to operate with lower overhead and provide their services more cheaply than traditional financial institutions. As a result, lenders can earn higher returns compared to savings and investment products offered by banks, while borrowers can borrow money at lower interest rates, even after the P2P lending company has taken a fee for providing the match-making platform and credit checking the borrower. There is the risk of the borrower defaulting on the loans taken out from peer-lending websites.

Peer-to-peer fundraising encourages supporters of a charity or non-profit organisation to individually raise money. It's a subcategory of crowdfunding. Instead of having one main crowdfunding page where everybody donates, people can have multiple individual fundraising pages with peer-to-peer fundraising, which the individual people will share with their own networks.

Also known as crowdlending, many peer-to-peer loans are unsecured personal loans, though some of the largest amounts are lent to businesses. Secured loans are sometimes offered by using luxury assets such as jewelry, watches, vintage cars, fine art, buildings, aircraft, and other business assets as collateral. They are made to an individual, company or charity. Other forms of peer-to-peer lending include student loans, commercial and real estate loans, payday loans, as well as secured business loans, leasing, and factoring.

The interest rates can be set by lenders who compete for the lowest rate on the reverse auction model or fixed by the intermediary company on the basis of an analysis of the borrower's credit. The lender's investment in the loan is not normally protected by any government guarantee. On some services, lenders mitigate the risk of bad debt by choosing which borrowers to lend to, and mitigate total risk by diversifying their investments among different borrowers.

The lending intermediaries are for-profit businesses; they generate revenue by collecting a one-time fee on funded loans from borrowers and by assessing a loan servicing fee to investors (tax-disadvantaged in the UK vs charging borrowers) or borrowers (either a fixed amount annually or a percentage of the loan amount). Compared to stock markets, peer-to-peer lending tends to have both less volatility and less liquidity.

== Characteristics ==
Peer-to-peer lending does not fit cleanly into any of the three traditional types of financial institutions – deposit takers, investors, insurers – and is sometimes categorized as an alternative financial service.

Typical characteristics of peer-to-peer lending are:

- it is sometimes conducted for profit;
- no necessary common bond or prior relationship between lenders and borrowers;
- intermediation by a peer-to-peer lending company;
- transactions take place online;
- lenders may often choose which borrowers to invest in, if the P2P platform offers that facility;
- the loans can be unsecured or secured and are not normally protected by government insurance;
- loans are securities that can be transferred to others, either for debt collection or profit, though not all P2P platforms provide transfer facilities or free pricing choices and costs can be very high, tens of percent of the amount sold, or nil.
- marketed via social media and social networks.

Early peer-to-peer lending was also characterized by disintermediation and reliance on social networks but these features have started to disappear. While it is still true that the emergence of internet and e-commerce makes it possible to do away with traditional financial intermediaries and that people may be less likely to default to the members of their own social communities, the emergence of new intermediaries has proven to be time and cost saving. Extending crowdsourcing to unfamiliar lenders and borrowers opens up new opportunities.

Most peer-to-peer intermediaries provide the following services:

- online investment platform to enable borrowers to attract lenders and investors to identify and purchase loans that meet their investment criteria
- development of credit models for loan approvals and pricing
- verifying borrower identity, bank account, employment and income
- performing borrower credit checks and filtering out the unqualified borrowers
- processing payments from borrowers and forwarding those payments to the lenders who invested in the loan
- servicing loans, providing customer service to borrowers and attempting to collect payments from borrowers who are delinquent or in default
- legal compliance and reporting
- finding new lenders and borrowers (marketing)

== History ==
=== United Kingdom ===
Zopa, founded in February 2005, was the first peer-to-peer lending company in the United Kingdom. Funding Circle, launched in August 2010, became the first significant peer-to-business lender and offering small businesses loans from investors via the platform. Funding Circle has originated over £6.3 billion in loans.

In 2011, Quakle, a UK peer-to-peer lender founded in 2010, closed down with a near 100% default rate after attempting to measure a borrower's creditworthiness according to a group score, similar to the feedback scores on eBay; the model failed to encourage repayment.

In 2012, the UK government invested £20 million into British businesses via peer to peer lenders. A second investment of £40 million was announced in 2014. The intention was to bypass the high street banks, which were reluctant to lend to smaller companies. This action was criticised for creating unfair competition in the UK, by concentrating financial support in the largest platforms.

Investments have qualified for tax advantages through the Innovative Finance Individual Savings Account (IFISA) since April 2016. In 2016, £80bn was invested in ISAs, creating a significant opportunity for P2P platforms. By January 2017, 17 P2P providers were approved to offer the product.

At one stage there were over 100 individual platforms applying for FCA authorisation, although many withdrew their applications as of 2015.

Since April 2014, the peer-to-peer lending industry has been regulated by the Financial Conduct Authority to increase accountability with standard reporting and facilitate the growth of the sector. Peer-to-peer investments do not qualify for protection from the Financial Services Compensation Scheme (FSCS), which provides security up to £85,000 per bank, for each saver, but regulations mandate the companies to implement arrangements to ensure the servicing of the loans even if the platform goes bust.

In 2015, UK peer-to-peer lenders collectively lent over £3bn to consumers and businesses.

According to the Cambridge Centre for Alternative Finance (Entrenching Innovation Report), £3.55B was attributed to peer to peer alternative finance models, the largest growth area being property showing a rise of 88% from 2015 to 2016.

=== United States ===
The peer-to-peer lending industry in the US started in February 2006 with the launch of Prosper Marketplace, followed by LendingClub. Both Prosper and LendingClub are headquartered in San Francisco, California. Early peer-to-peer platforms had few restrictions on borrower eligibility, which resulted in adverse selection problems and high borrower default rates. In addition, some investors viewed the lack of liquidity for these loans, most of which have a minimum three-year term, as undesirable.

In 2008, the U.S. Securities and Exchange Commission (SEC) required that peer-to-peer companies register their offerings as securities, pursuant to the Securities Act of 1933. The registration process was an arduous one; Prosper and LendingClub had to temporarily suspend offering new loans, while others, such as the U.K.-based Zopa Ltd., exited the U.S. market entirely. Both LendingClub and Prosper gained approval from the SEC to offer investors notes backed by payments received on the loans. Prosper amended its filing to allow banks to sell previously funded loans on the Prosper platform. Both LendingClub and Prosper formed partnerships with FOLIOfn to create a secondary market for their notes, providing liquidity to investors. LendingClub had a voluntary registration at this time, whereas Prosper had mandatory registration for all members.

This addressed the liquidity problem and, in contrast to traditional securitization markets, resulted in making the loan requests of peer-to-peer companies more transparent for the lenders and secondary buyers who can access the detailed information concerning each individual loan (without knowing the actual identities of borrowers) before deciding which loans to fund. The peer-to-peer companies are also required to detail their offerings in a regularly updated prospectus. The SEC makes the reports available to the public via EDGAR (Electronic Data-Gathering, Analysis, and Retrieval).

More people turned to peer-to-peer companies for borrowing following the 2008 financial crisis because banks refused to increase their loan portfolios. The peer-to-peer market also faced increased investor scrutiny because borrowers' defaults became more frequent and investors were unwilling to take on unnecessary risk.

In 2013, LendingClub was the largest peer-to-peer lender in US based upon issued loan volume and revenue, followed by Prosper. LendingClub was also the largest peer-to-peer lending platform worldwide. The interest rates ranged from 5.6 to 35.8%, depending on the loan term and borrower rating. The default rates varied from about 1.5% to 10% for the more risky borrowers. Executives from traditional financial institutions are joining the peer-to-peer companies as board members, lenders and investors, indicating that the new financing model is establishing itself in the mainstream. LendingClub abandoned the peer-to-peer lending model in the fall of 2020.

=== China ===
Many micro loan companies have emerged to serve the 40 million SMEs, many of which receive inadequate financing from state-owned banks, creating an entire industry that runs alongside big banks.

As the Internet and e-commerce grew in the 2000s, many P2P lenders were founded with various target customers and business models.

The first P2PL in Hong Kong was WeLab, which has backing from American venture capital firm Sequoia Capital and Li Ka-Shing's TOM Group.

Ezubao, a website launched by Yucheng Group in July 2014 purporting to offer P2P services, was shut down in February 2016 by authorities who described it as a Ponzi scheme. Ezubao took in 50 billion renminbi from 900,000 investors.

In China, in 2016 there were more than 4,000 P2P lending platforms, but 2,000 of them had already suspended operations. As of August 2016, cash flow on all P2P lending platform have already exceeded 191 billion Chinese Yuan (US$29 billion) in the month. Lender's return rate across all P2P lending platform in China is about 10% per annum on average, with a few of them offering more than 24% return rate. A colloquial term for P2P lending in Chinese translates as "grey market", but is not to be confused with grey markets for goods or an underground economy.

In June and July 2018, scores of Chinese online P2P lending platforms fell into financial or legal troubles because of tightened regulation and liquidity. According to WDZJ.com, a P2P industry information provider, 23 P2P platforms were reported to be in financial distress or under investigation in the first 10 days of July. That follows 63 such cases in June, a higher number than in any month in the previous year.

In late June, Shanghai police detained four senior executives of Tangxiaoseng, an online lending platform controlled by Zibang Financial Service Internet Technology Co. Ltd. and told investors on June 28, 2018, that Zibang Financial was suspected of "illegally raising funds from the public." On July 20, 2018, iqianbang.com, a Beijing-based P2P lending platform announced to close down, citing "deteriorating online lending environment and drying up liquidity."

People's Bank of China announced in early July 2018 said that regulators will extend a two-year-old nationwide campaign to clean up fraud and violations in the online financial market, targeting P2P and other online lending and financial activities. More than 5,000 operations have been shut down since the campaign began in 2016.

In April 2019, one of China's top peer-to-peer (P2P) lending platforms, tuandai.com, collapsed, resulting in financial losses for scores of Chinese investors.

By August 2020 the number of licensed P2P lenders in China had been cut to 29, and defunct platforms still owed depositors 800 billion yuan (US$115 billion). By mid-November 2020 no P2P lenders were still operating, down from a peak of 5,970 in 2017.

=== Australia ===
In 2012 Australia's first peer to peer lending platform, SocietyOne, was launched. As of June 2016 the Australian Government has been encouraging the development of financial technology and peer to peer lending startups through its regulatory sandbox program.

=== New Zealand ===
In New Zealand, peer-to-peer lending became practicable on April 1, 2014, when the relevant provisions of the Financial Markets Conduct Act 2013 came into force. The Act enables peer-to-peer lending services to be licensed.

The Financial Markets Authority issued the first peer-to-peer lending service licence on July 8, 2014, to Harmoney. Harmoney officially launched its service on October 10, 2014.

=== India ===
In India, peer-to-peer lending is currently regulated by the Reserve Bank of India, India's Central Bank. It has published a consultation paper on regulation of P2P lending and the final guidelines were released in 2017. There were over 30 peer-to-peer-lending platforms in India in 2016. Even with first-mover advantage many sites were not able to capture market share and grow their user base, arguably because of the reserved nature of Indian investors or lack of awareness of this type of debt financing. However, peer-to-peer lending platforms in India are helping a huge section of borrowers who have previously been rejected or have failed to qualify for a loan from banks.

As on August 31, 2019, 19 companies have been granted licenses by the Reserve Bank of India.

=== Sweden ===
Peer-to-peer-lending in Sweden is regulated by Finansinspektionen. Launched in 2007, the company Trustbuddy AB was first out on the Swedish market for peer-to-peer-lending, providing a platform for high risk personal loans between 500SEK and 10,000SEK. Trustbuddy filed for bankruptcy by October 2015, a new board cited abuses by outgoing leadership.

=== Israel ===
Several peer-to-peer lending services initiated operation and loan origination during 2014, Following the economic uprising of 2011, and public opinion regarding these platforms is positive. The maximum interest rate in Israeli P2P Arenas is limited by the "Extra-Banking Lending Regulations".

=== Canada ===
Loans made under peer-to-peer lending are considered securities and as such P2P platforms must register with securities regulators and adapt themselves to existing regulatory models. This means limiting investors to some institutional investors or finding novel approaches in tandem with regulators. Canadian Capital Markets Securities Regulators (members of the Canadian Securities Administrators) are recent entrants to Canadian Peer-to-Peer P2P lending and are only issuing interim approvals "in order to test their products, services and applications throughout the Canadian market on a time limited basis." through "Regulatory Sandbox" programs including the CSA Regulatory Sandbox and the Ontario Securities Commission Sandbox, branded as "OSC Launchpad".

=== Brazil ===
Since April 2018, Brazilian p2p lending companies may operate directly without the intermediation of a bank or other financial institution.

By means of the Resolution 4656/2018, the Central Bank of Brazil created a new type of institution called SEP (personal lending society) that aims to provide a platform for direct negotiation of loans between individuals and companies. A SEP cannot lend using its own resources but only operate as an intermediary. The borrower must be Brazilian individual or company, but there isn't a restriction regarding lenders nationality.

=== Latvia ===
Latvian P2P lending market is developing rapidly. In Q2 2018 Latvian P2P platforms lent Eur 271.8 million and Eur 1.7 Billion cumulatively. Currently, the most active investors in Latvia's peer-to-peer lending platforms are residents of Germany, Great Britain, and Estonia.

The two biggest P2P platforms are Mintos and Twino. Around nine companies that qualify as P2P investment platform currently operate in Latvia. Mintos was founded in 2015. In September 2018 the total amount of loans funded through Mintos have surpassed Eur 1 billion. Most of the loans funded through Mintos are personal loans with car loans coming second. In 2016 Mintos has raised Eur 2 million in funding from Latvian-based Venture Capital Skillion Ventures. Twino investment platform was launched in 2015, although the company has been operating since 2009 as a loan originator. Since the inception in 2009 Twino has lent more than Eur 500 million in loans. More than 90% of all loans that are on Twino platform are short maturity from one to three months.

In 2015, the Ministry of Finance of Latvia initiated development of a new regulation on the peer-to-peer lending in Latvia to establish regulatory requirements, such as rules for management compliance, AML requirements and other prudential measures.

=== Ireland ===
The Irish P2P lending platform Linked Finance was launched in 2013. In 2016, Linked Finance was also authorised to operate in the UK by the Financial Conduct Authority. In 2015, Initiative Ireland launched the first property-backed secured lending P2P platform in Ireland.

=== Indonesia ===
In Indonesia, P2P lending is growing fast in recent years and is regulated under OJK since 2016. As of April 2019, there are 106 P2P platforms registered in OJK. P2P platforms provide loans targeting particularly into unbanked population, which is estimated to be around 100+ million in Indonesia.

Thousands of P2P platforms are illegal. Their applications are believed to be stealing customer's data such as phone contacts and photos. These are then used by the debt collectors to intimidate the customers. The debt collectors contact family members, friends, and even employers of the customers then telling them that the customers have debt that needs to be paid. Some of them commit suicide due to the pressure. Many cases are reported in the Indonesia's complaint handling system. Yet the police have not taken serious actions against these cases.

=== Bulgaria ===
There is no specific peer-to-peer lending regulation in Bulgaria. Currently, Klear Lending is the only Bulgarian platform. It was launched in 2016 and provides personal loans to prime customers. The peer-to-peer lending platform is operated by Klear Lending AD, a financial institution registered in the Register per article 3a of the Credit Institutions Act maintained by the Bulgarian National Bank.

=== South Korea ===
In South Korea, Money Auction and Pop Funding are the very first peer to peer lending companies founded in 2006 and 2007 respectively. The South Korean P2P lending industry did not attract much public attention until late 2014 and early 2015, during which period a number of new fintech companies were founded underpinned by the global fintech wave with the emergence of Lending Club as the mainstream P2P lending player in the US. New P2P lending companies launched in South Korea during this period include 8 Percent, Terafunding, Lendit, Honest Fund and Funda. At the beginning, 8 Percent, Lendit and Honest Fund focused on personal loan origination and Terafunding was the only P2P platform dedicated to the real estate backed loan origination, founded by ex-real estate broker and investor, Tae Young Yang.

There was a brief period of regulatory uncertainty on the P2P business model as the P2P lending model was not officially legalized under the then regulatory regime. 8 percent was briefly shut down by the regulator in Feb 2015 and was reopened again. The South Korean P2P industry saw an explosive growth in a year. According to the regulator, cumulative P2P lending platform loan origination increased to KRW 311,800,000,000 as of December in 2016 from KRW 72,400,000,000 in March and there was a debate as to whether the industry was getting overheated, with questions on whether the industry offered appropriate investor protection. To respond to these concerns, as of February 2017, South Korean regulators imposed an annual investment limit of KRW 10,000,000 for a retail investor on these lending platforms, and KRW 40,000,000 for certain qualified investors.

As of April 2017, there are 148 P2P lending companies in South Korea. However, only 40 companies are official members of the South Korea P2P Finance Association. These members include Lendit, Roof Funding, Midrate, HF Honest Fund, Villy, 8 Percent, Terafunding, Together Funding and People Funding. According to the South Korea P2P Finance Association, cumulative loan lent by its member P2P companies stands at c. KRW 2.3 TRN as of March 2018. By origination category, real estate project financing origination constitutes c. KRW 768,500,000,000, real estate asset backed origination is KRW 611,500,000,000, other asset backed KRW 472,400,000,000 and personal loan origination stands at KRW 443,200,000,000. Average interest yield offered by the member companies is 14.32%.

=== Germany ===
In Germany, P2P lending is growing fast in recent years and is regulated under Federal Financial Supervisory Authority. The transaction volume will reach an estimated value of €252 million in 2020.

== Legal regulation ==
In many countries, soliciting investments from the general public is considered illegal. Crowd sourcing arrangements in which people are asked to contribute money in exchange for potential profits based on the work of others are considered to be securities.

Dealing with financial securities is connected to the question of ownership: in the case of person-to-person loans, the problem is who owns the loans (notes) and how that ownership is transferred between the originator of the loan (the person-to-person lending company) and the individual lender(s). This question arises especially when a peer-to-peer lending company does not merely connect lenders and borrowers but also borrows money from users and then lends it out again. Such activity is interpreted as a sale of securities, and a broker-dealer license and the registration of the person-to-person investment contract is required for the process to be legal. The license and registration can be obtained at a securities regulatory agency such as the U.S. Securities and Exchange Commission (SEC) in the U.S., the Ontario Securities Commission in Ontario, Canada, the Autorité des marchés financiers in France and Québec, Canada, or the Financial Services Authority in the UK.

Securities offered by the U.S. peer-to-peer lenders are registered with and regulated by the SEC. A recent report by the U.S. Government Accountability Office explored the potential for additional regulatory oversight by Consumer Financial Protection Bureau or the Federal Deposit Insurance Corporation, though neither organization has proposed direct oversight of peer-to-peer lending at this time.

In the UK, the emergence of multiple competing lending companies and problems with subprime loans has resulted in calls for additional legislative measures that institute minimum capital standards and checks on risk controls to preclude lending to riskier borrowers, using unscrupulous lenders or misleading consumers about lending terms.

== Advantages and criticism ==
=== Interest rates ===
One of the main advantages of person-to-person lending for borrowers can sometimes be better rates than traditional bank rates can offer. The advantages for lenders can be higher returns than obtainable from a savings account or other investments, but subject to risk of loss, unlike a savings account. Interest rates and the methodology for calculating those rates varies among peer-to-peer lending platforms. The interest rates may also have a lower volatility than other investment types.

=== Socially-conscious investment ===
For investors interested in socially conscious investing, peer-to-peer lending offers the possibility of supporting the attempts of individuals to break free from high-rate debt, assist persons engaged in occupations or activities that are deemed moral and positive to the community, and avoid investment in persons employed in industries deemed immoral or detrimental to community.

=== Credit risk ===
Peer-to-peer lending also attracts borrowers who, because of their credit status or the lack thereof, are unqualified for traditional bank loans. Because past behavior is frequently indicative of future performance and low credit scores correlate with high likelihood of default, peer-to-peer intermediaries have started to decline a large number of applicants and charge higher interest rates to riskier borrowers that are approved.

It seemed initially that one of the appealing characteristics of peer-to-peer lending for investors was low default rates, e.g. Prosper's default rate was quoted to be only at about 2.7% in 2007.

The actual default rates for the loans originated by Prosper in 2007 were in fact higher than projected. Prosper's aggregate return (across all credit grades and as measured by LendStats.com, based upon actual Prosper marketplace data) for the 2007 vintage was (6.44)%, for the 2008 vintage (2.44)%, and for the 2009 vintage 8.10%. Independent projections for the 2010 vintage are of an aggregate return of 9.87. During the period from 2006 through October 2008 (referred to as 'Prosper 1.0'), Prosper issued 28,936 loans, all of which have since matured. 18,480 of the loans fully paid off and 10,456 loans defaulted, a default rate of 36.1%. $46,671,123 of the $178,560,222 loaned out during this period was written off by investors, a loss rate of 26.1%.

Since inception, Lending Club's default rate ranges from 1.4% for top-rated three-year loans to 9.8% for the riskiest loans.

The UK peer-to-peer lenders quote the ratio of bad loans at 0.84% for Zopa of the £200m during its first seven years of lending history. As of November 2013, Funding Circle's current bad debt level was 1.5%, with an average 5.8% return after all bad debt and fees. This is comparable to the 3–5% ratio of mainstream banks and the result of modern credit models and efficient risk management technologies used by P2P companies.

At the other end of the range are places such as Bondora that do lending to less credit-worthy customers, with default rates varying up to as high as 70+% for loans made to Slovak borrowers on that platform, well above those of its original Estonian market.

=== Government protection ===
Because, unlike depositors in banks, peer-to-peer lenders can choose themselves whether to lend their money to safer borrowers with lower interest rates or to riskier borrowers with higher returns, in the US peer-to-peer lending is treated legally as investment and the repayment in case of borrower defaulting is not guaranteed by the federal government (U.S. Federal Deposit Insurance Corporation) the way bank deposits are.

A class action lawsuit, Hellum v. Prosper Marketplace, Inc., was held in Superior Court of California on behalf of all investors who purchased a note on the Prosper platform between January 1, 2006, and October 14, 2008. The plaintiffs alleged that Prosper offered and sold unqualified and unregistered securities, in violation of California and federal securities laws during that period. Plaintiffs further allege that Prosper acted as an unlicensed broker/dealer in California. The Plaintiffs were seeking rescission of the loan notes, rescissory damages, damages, and attorneys' fees and expenses. On July 19, 2013, the class action lawsuit was settled. Under the settlement terms Prosper will pay $10 million to the class action members.

=== Peer-to-peer lending sponsors ===
Peer-to-peer lending sponsors are organizations that handle loan administration on behalf of others including individual lenders and lending agencies, but do not loan their own money. Notable peer-to-peer lending sponsors include:

- Kiva
- Lendwithcare
- MYC4 (defunct)
- Vittana (defunct)
- Wokai (defunct)
- Zidisha

== See also ==
- Alternative finance
- Alternative financial services
- Comparison of crowdfunding services
- Customer to customer
- Non-bank financial institution
- Peer-to-peer banking
- Self-Organized Funding Allocation
- Social media in the financial services sector
- Peer-to-peer lending companies
