= Paradigm (venture capital firm) =

American crypto investment firm

Paradigm Operations LP
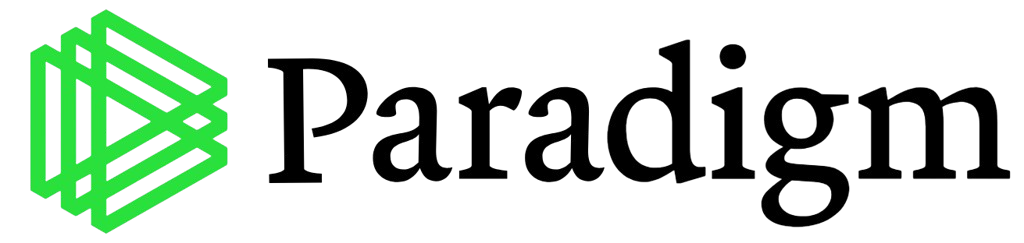
- Type: Private
- Industry: Venture Capital
- Founded: June 2018; 8 years ago
- Founders: Fred Ehrsam; Matt Huang
- Headquarters: San Francisco, California
- Key people: Alana Palmedo; Managing partner
- AUM: US$12.7 billion (2024)
- Number of employees: 59 (2024)
- Website: www.paradigm.xyz

Paradigm Operations LP, doing business as Paradigm, is an American investment firm based in San Francisco, California. The firm focuses on investments related to cryptocurrency and blockchain technology. As of April 2025, Paradigm has $12.7 billion in assets under management.

== Background ==
In June 2018, Paradigm was founded by Coinbase co-founder Fred Ehrsam and Sequoia Capital Partner Matt Huang. This came at a time during a cryptocurrency bubble burst where cryptocurrency prices dropped significantly. The duo founded the company to invest in cryptocurrencies and the companies. Alana Palmedo joined four weeks later, initially managing trade settlements, compliance, and finance, and later becoming managing partner.

== Investments ==
In October 2018, Paradigm obtained $750 million in funding from institutional investors like Harvard, Yale, and Stanford to create an open-ended fund with no deadline to return the capital. The fund would invest 60% in cryptocurrencies and 40% startup equity stakes. Institutional investors were wary of cryptocurrency and did not want to have direct exposure but Paradigm was seen as a trustworthy investor in part due to its founders being seen as reliable due to their experience and reputation. Paradigm called for $400 million up front to invest in Ethereum and Bitcoin using Tagomi, a trading desk it invested in. Paradigm was able to obtain cryptocurrency exposure for its investors at a low price which later rose significantly in value. An additional $350 million was added as a top-off for the first fund.

Paradigm had also invested in cryptocurrency related startups such as Uniswap. By October 2020, 13 of Paradigm's 28 startup investment had already raised or circulated tokens at higher valuations. It drew comparison to peers such as Pantera Capital and Andreessen Horowitz.

In November 2021, Paradigm raised $2.5 billion for Paradigm One, its first venture capital fund and at the time was the largest cryptocurrency related venture capital fund in history. The amount raised was twice than initially targeted. Sam Bankman-Fried was an investor of the fund via Alameda Research and in return the fund invested in FTX. Paradigm was considered a central investor in FTX.

In January 2021, Paradigm and Sequoia Capital invested $1.15 billion in Citadel Securities making them the first outsider investors in the firm.

== Uniswap lawsuits ==
In April 2022, a Uniswap customer sued Uniswap for failing to address rampant fraud on the platform. Uniswap investors Paradigm, Andreessen Horowitz, and Union Square Ventures were also included in the lawsuit for developing and promoting the platform. However, in August 2024, a federal judge decided to throw out the lawsuit ruling in favour of Uniswap.

== FTX bankruptcy ==
In November 2022, due to the bankruptcy of FTX, Paradigm had its $278 million investment in FTX written down to zero. In February 2023, Paradigm, Sequoia Capital, Thoma Bravo were sued in a class action for hyping the legitimacy of FTX. Paradigm was involved in the trial of Sam Bankman-Fried and during the trial it was revealed that Paradigm had initial misgivings on investing in FTX but were manipulated by Bankman-Fried to invest in it.

== Post 2023 ==
In May 2023, The Block reported Paradigm's website homepage completely removed any mention of Web3 or crypto and had changed to "research-driven technology," which included artificial intelligence (AI). Paradigm downplayed the shift to AI stating it had not pivoted away from crypto although its team had been experimenting with AI. Investors as well as portfolio company founders were upset by the brand change stating they were not notified in advance. At that point, Paradigm had not invested in any AI startups.

In September 2023, Paradigm submitted an amicus curiae arguing that the U.S. Securities and Exchange Commission had overstepped its authority when it filed charges against Binance in June that year.

In June 2026, Paradigm disclosed that it had been the anonymous winning bidder for artist Jim Sanborn's private Kryptos archive, which sold at auction in November 2025 for $962,500 and included the unpublished solution to K4, the sculpture's long-unsolved fourth cipher. The firm also launched a Kryptos website and a ten-puzzle "capture the flag"-style challenge inviting the public to attempt K4, with $1,000 awarded to the first solver of each puzzle.

== Ehrsam's departure ==
In October 2023, Ehrsam stepped down from his managing partner role at Paradigm. Huang remained as the managing partner.

== See also ==
- Pantera Capital
- Polychain Capital
- Ribbit Capital
