= BTCJam =

BTCjam
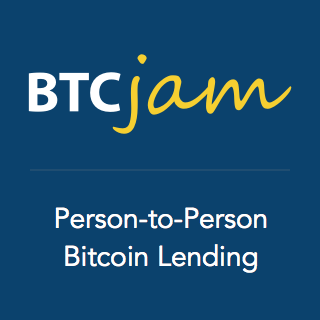
- Type: Private
- Industry: Personal Finance, Software
- Founded: 2012; 14 years ago
- Founder: Celso Pitta
- Defunct: 2017
- Headquarters: 211 Sutter St. San Francisco, United States
- Products: Peer-to-Peer Lending
- Number of employees: 1–10
- Website: btcjam.com

BTCjam was a peer-to-peer lending (aka "P2P lending") service where individuals could borrow or lend using bitcoin. The company claimed it intended to let users in countries that lack a local credit score system to receive loans. Its claimed mission was to make credit affordable and accessible everywhere. According to one source, BTCJam was "the first P2P lending platform to cross national borders successfully.

BTCjam was part of the 500 Startups accelerator program and received investments from Ribbit Capital, Foundation Capital, Pantera Capital, and other venture capital firms. It has facilitated bitcoin loans for more than US$14,000,000 in over 120 countries.

BTCJam closed on 2017, claiming regulatory difficulties operating out of various jurisdictions.

== History ==
BTCjam was founded in late 2012 by Celso Pitta, a Brazilian computer engineer and former Citibank employee. During its first year of operation, the average loan size ranged from approximately US$400 to US$600.

By 2016, the platform had served more than 16,000 loans across 121 countries, many of them in regions classified as unbanked, and had been characterised as "by far the largest microloan/microfinance site powered by Bitcoin."

== Closure ==
In March 2016, BTCjam stopped accepting customers from the United States for regulatory reasons.

In 2017 the company shut down entirely and ceased operations.

== See also ==
- Comparison of crowdfunding services
- Disintermediation
