= SEC v. Wahi =

US Federal court case involving cryptocurrency insider trading

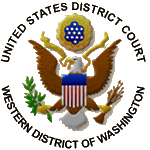
- Court: United States District Court for the Western District of Washington
- Full case name: Securities and Exchange Commission v. Ishan Wahi, Nikhil Wahi, and Sameer Ramani

SEC v. Wahi is a pending United States federal court case in which the U.S. Securities and Exchange Commission accuses former Coinbase executive Ishan Wahi, along with Ishan's brother Nikhil and their friend Sameer Ramani, of engaging in insider trading. It is the first insider-trading investigation which involves the cryptocurrency market. Led by US Attorney Damian Williams and filed by SEC litigants Daniel Maher and Peter Lallas, the trial will be held in the United States District Court for the Western District of Washington's Seattle division.

The dates of when the case will be heard have not been settled, though the SEC has requested a trial by jury. Both of the Wahi brothers have pled guilty, with Nikhil being sentenced to 10 months, while Ishan's sentence is presently pending. Ramani, however, remains at large.

== Background ==
Coinbase, the largest US cryptocurrency exchange, in May 2020 publicly announced that it would begin listing certain crypto assets on its trading platform.

In October 2020, Coinbase hired Ishan as a manager in its Assets and Investing Products group, which was responsible for supporting and coordinating the Coinbase listing announcements described herein. Coinbase determined that because Ishan was regularly entrusted with material, nonpublic information, he was a "Covered Person" under its Global Trading Policy and Digital Asset Trading Policy. As part of this, Ishan was involved in the highly confidential process of listing crypto assets on Coinbase's exchanges. Ishan had detailed and advanced knowledge of which crypto assets Coinbase was planning to list and the timing of public announcements about those crypto asset listings. Beginning at least in August 2021 and continuing through May 2022, Wahi was also a member of a private Coinbase messaging channel reserved for a small number of Coinbase employees with direct involvement in the Coinbase asset listing process. Coinbase has internal policies which forbid and advise against disclosing "Material Nonpublic Information" to any other person, even co-workers, family or friends." Coinbase's policies expressly defined "material nonpublic information" to include "information about a decision by Coinbase to list, not list, or add features to a Digital Asset.

The SEC outlined the listing of the cryptocurrency POWR as an example of Wahi's insider trading. On November 12, 2021, Ishan learned that Coinbase would soon announce the listing of the crypto asset POWR. On November 15, 2021, just minutes after receiving confirmation that POWR would be listed later that day, Ishan called Nikhil. Beginning at 2:52 pm ET – just two minutes before the Coinbase listing announcement – a blockchain address Nikhil controlled purchased 18,413 POWR at a cost of approximately $7,000. Almost immediately after the announcement, that blockchain address exchanged those POWR tokens for approximately $10,050 in another crypto asset. As a result, Nikhil realized illicit proceeds of approximately $3,050. A similar pattern occurred when Coinbase listed the cryptocurrencies AMP, RLY, and DDX.

According to the SEC, the defendants, knowing Ishan was providing material nonpublic information, took steps to conceal their trading, using multiple accounts, wallets, and platforms, including foreign ones, and a non-US phone with a non-US number.

In its initial filings to the court, the SEC accuses Ishan Wahi from June 2021 to April 2022, of repeatedly tipping nonpublic information about the timing and content of when Coinbase's will list certain cryptocurrencies to Nikhil and Ramani, who used this information to trade ahead of multiple listing announcements. Nikhil and Ramani earning at least $1.1 million in illicit profits. The SEC blasted Ishan for "breaching of his duty to Coinbase for a personal benefit".

== Charges ==
All three defendants are accused of wire fraud and conspiracy to commit wire fraud. The SEC's prayer for relief insists that the court find that the three defendants violated federal securities laws, permanently restrain and enjoin Defendants from, directly or indirectly, engaging in cryptocurrency trading. fine the three to pay civil penalties, and order the three defendants to surrender an amount equal to the illicit proceeds they obtained through Nikhil's and Ramani's trading.

=== Ishan's attempt to flee the United States ===
In a U.S. Department of Justice press release, Williams further accuses the three of attempting to flee the United States. On the evening of Sunday, May 15, 2022, Ishan purchased a one-way flight to India that was scheduled to depart the next day shortly before Ishan was supposed to be interviewed by Coinbase in its apparent investigation of Ishan's possible insider trading. In the hours between booking the flight and his scheduled departure, Ishan called and texted Nikhil and Ramani about Coinbase's investigation, and sent both of them a photograph of the messages he had received on May 11, 2022, from Coinbase's director of security operations. Prior to boarding the May 16, 2022 flight to India, Ishan was stopped by law enforcement and prevented from leaving the country.

== Reactions ==
=== Pre-trial ===
Coinbase blasted the allegations and charges, with Coinbase's legal chief Paul Grewal paying particular attention to how the SEC in its court filings determined cryptocurrencies and other digital assets to be securities. In a blog post, Grewal bluntly stated "Coinbase does not list securities. End of story." Coinbase was met with opposition by the San Francisco-based blockchain company Ripple Labs (which currently is in its own legal battle with the SEC), saying that per the "Howey test" as defined in SEC v. W. J. Howey Co., cryptocurrencies are securities. According to CNBC journalist Ryan Browne, the SEC's position on cryptocurrencies in this trial is significant as it sets precedent for regulating cryptocurrencies and imposes unwanted regulations on Coinbase's practices.

K&L Gates, through the National Law Review, argued that the case has the ability to heavily impact the industry surrounding cryptocurrencies and digital assets, especially cryptocurrency exchange. The firm argues that if the SEC succeeds in convicting the Wahi brothers and Ramani on all of its counts, the court would find that cryptocurrencies and other digital assets are treated the same way as stocks and bonds, and the ruling would both force exchanges like Coinbase to register with the SEC as investment companies and enable the SEC to charge Coinbase with failing to register as an investment company with them.

== Sentencing ==
On January 10, 2023, Nikhil Wahi was sentenced to 10 months in prison after he admitted making trades based on confidential information from Coinbase. U.S. District Judge Loretta Preska said Wahi's crime was "not an isolated error in judgment."

Ishan Wahi pled guilty on February 7, apologizing to both the court and to Coinbase. On May 9, 2023, Ishan Wahi was sentenced to two years in prison and ordered to forfeit various crypto assets that he received in connection with the scheme. U.S. Attorney Damian Williams said the sentence "should send a strong signal to all participants in the cryptocurrency markets that the laws decidedly do apply to them."

The judgement forbid Ishan and Nikhil Wahi from ever participating again in the securities market, and also required them to pay disgorgement for "ill-gotten gains." The National Law Journal quoted a partner from Winston & Strawn, a law firm, that " fact the SEC was willing to settle the matter without any admissions related to trading securities from the Wahi brothers is a tacit omission that this wasn't a battle they wanted to fight." Ultimately, with both brothers agreeing they would not deny the SEC's allegations, neither received a penalty, and the disgorgement order was deemed covered by the related criminal proceedings. The statement by the brothers, the Economic Times noted, did not include an admission that they believed the crypto assets at issue were considered securities.

On October 19, 2023, the SEC requested the courts put Sameer Ramani into default, for not submitting pleadings or defences to the SEC's earlier complaint.
