= Fairshake =

American pro-crypto political action committee

- Formation: March 23, 2023; 3 years ago
- Type: Super PAC
- Registration no.: C00835959
- Region served: United States
- Affiliations: Protect Progress; Defend American Jobs
- Revenue: $260,070,709 USD (January 2023 to December 2024)
- Website: fairshakepac.com

Fairshake is a Super PAC funded by the cryptocurrency industry that supported pro-cryptocurrency candidates in the 2024 United States elections. Major contributors include Coinbase, Ripple, and Andreessen Horowitz. Fairshake spent nearly twice as much on Republican candidates than on Democratic candidates.

== History ==
Fairshake comprises three affiliated super PACs: Fairshake; Defend American Jobs, which spends in Republican primaries; and Protect Progress, which spends in Democratic primaries.

=== 2024 ===
In 2024, Fairshake and its affiliates spent over than $133 million to support pro-cryptocurrency candidates.

It spent over $10 million against Katie Porter's Democratic primary bid to represent California in the U.S. Senate, $2.5 million supporting Democrat Shomari Figures to win the race to serve as U.S. representative for Alabama's 2nd congressional district, $2 million supporting George Latimer against incumbent Jamaal Bowman's Democratic primary bid to represent New York's 16th congressional district, $40 million supporting Republican Bernie Moreno against incumbent Ohio Democratic senator Sherrod Brown, $10 million supporting Democrat Elissa Slotkin against Republican Mike Rogers to represent Michigan in the U.S. Senate, $10 million supporting Democrat Ruben Gallego against Republican Kari Lake to represent Arizona in the U.S. Senate, $4.2 million to support Republican John Deaton's failed attempt to unseat incumbent Democratic Massachusetts U.S. senator Elizabeth Warren, $173,000 in support of Ritchie Torres, $150,000 in support of Dan Goldman, $500,000 in support of Jimmy Gomez, and $2 million in support of Pat Ryan.

By June 2024, CNBC reported that Fairshake had backed the winning candidate in 33 of the 35 House and Senate primary races it had entered. Following the 2024 presidential election, Brad Garlinghouse, CEO of Ripple Labs, claimed that the creation of Fairshake and other legislative efforts around cryptocurrency regulation are a reaction to the federal government's "War on Crypto." By November 2024, the group had already spent more than every sector of the U.S. economy except the fossil fuel industry when measured against each sector’s total political spending since the Supreme Court's landmark Citizens United decision lifted limits on corporate political spending. The group spent nearly twice as much supporting Republican candidates as they did supporting Democratic candidates.

==== Fundraising ====
According to the Federal Election Commission, Fairshake raised $260 million from its inception in March 2023 to December 2024 from 75 contributions with some donors contributing more than once.

Donors included:

- $93.5 million from Coinbase
- $45 million from Ripple Labs
- $25 million from Jump Trading
- $33.5 million from Ben Horowitz
- $33.5 million from Marc Andreessen
- $4.9 million from Cameron Winklevoss and Tyler Winklevoss (combined)
- $1 million from Brian Armstrong
- $1 million from Circle Internet Financial
- $1 million from Fred Wilson
- $1 million from Payward, Inc.
- $800,000 from Consensys
- $500,000 from Fred Ehrsam and Matt Huang (combined)
- $250,000 from Wences Casares
- $157,437 from Ark Invest
- $100,000 from Bradform Stephens and Bart Stephens (combined)

=== 2026 ===
As of January 2026, Fairshake and its affiliates had raised more than $193 million ahead of the 2026 midterm elections. Contributions to Fairshake in 2026 include $52.46 million from Coinbase, $48 million from Ripple, and $23.8 million from Ben Horowitz & Marc Andreessen.

In 2026, the group spent $55 million against Democrat Sherrod Brown, $12 million to support Republican Barry Moore’s primary campaign to represent Alabama in the U.S. Senate, $6.5 million to support Christian Menefee against Al Green's primary bid to represent Texas's 18th congressional district, $6 million to support Adrian Boafo in the primary to represent Maryland's 5th congressional district, $1 million in the primary against Robert Peters, $10 million in the primary against Juliana Stratton, $2 million in the primary against La Shawn Ford, $400,000 in the primary in support of French Hill, and $400,000 in the primary in support of Mike Rounds.

== See also ==
- Leading the Future
