= Fred Ehrsam =

American businessman (born 1988)

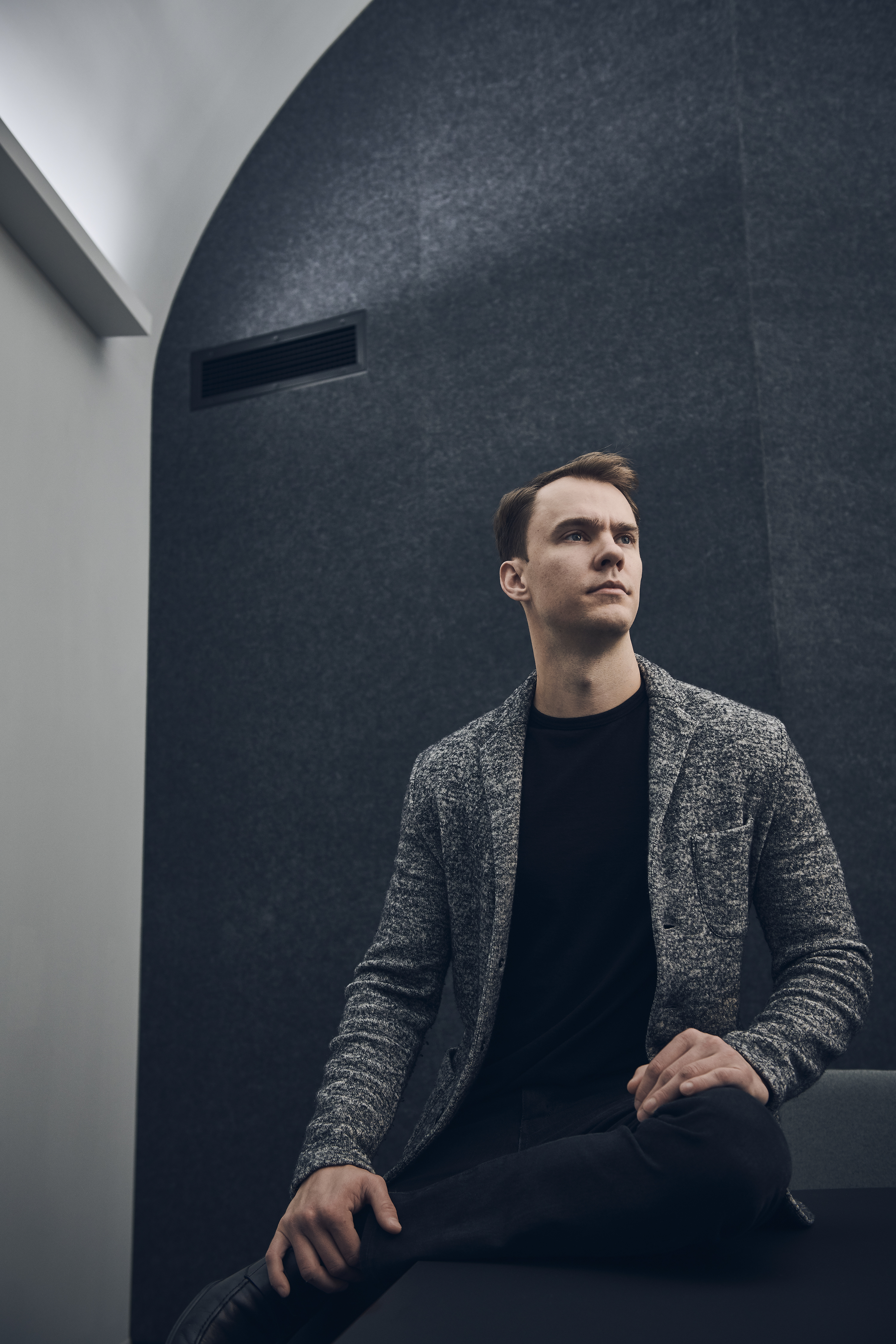
- Born: Frederick Ernest Ehrsam III; May 10, 1988 (age 38); Boston, Massachusetts, US
- Education: Duke University (BS)
- Occupations: Entrepreneur; investor
- Known for: Co-founding Coinbase and Paradigm
- Title: Co-founder and CEO of Nudge; Co-founder and general partner of Paradigm; Co-founder of Coinbase
- Website: www.fredehrsam.org

Frederick "Fred" Ernest Ehrsam III (born May 10, 1988) is an American entrepreneur and investor. He is the co-founder of cryptocurrency exchange Coinbase, the co-founder and general partner of the crypto-focused venture capital firm Paradigm, and the co-founder and CEO of Nudge, a neurotechnology startup developing non-invasive brain–computer interfaces.

== Early life and education ==
Ehrsam was born on May 10, 1988, in Boston, and grew up in Concord, Massachusetts. He attended Concord-Carlisle High School. During high school, he became an avid player of World of Warcraft, playing the game on a competitive level and spending thousands of hours exploring its in-game economy. This experience introduced him to the concept of digital currencies, as the game featured its own virtual gold economy driven by player supply and demand.

In 2010, Ehrsam graduated with distinction from Duke University, earning a Bachelor of Science in computer science with a minor in economics. At Duke, he was a member of the Sigma Alpha Epsilon fraternity.

== Career ==
=== Goldman Sachs ===
After graduating from Duke, Ehrsam joined Goldman Sachs in New York City as a foreign exchange trader, a position he held from 2010 to 2012. During his tenure there, he discovered Bitcoin through a paper written by a Georgetown University professor, and he began trading the cryptocurrency in his spare time. He purchased his first Bitcoin in 2011.

=== Coinbase ===
In 2012, Ehrsam and Brian Armstrong co-founded Coinbase in an apartment in San Francisco. The two had met through the Bitcoin subreddit forum on Reddit. Ehrsam served as Coinbase's first president, overseeing the company's growth from a simple platform for buying and selling Bitcoin into one of the largest cryptocurrency exchanges in the United States.

In January 2017, Ehrsam announced that he was stepping down from his day-to-day role at Coinbase, though he remained on its board of directors. In April 2021, Coinbase went public via a direct listing on the Nasdaq stock exchange. As of that date, Ehrsam reportedly still held approximately 8.9% of Coinbase stock and was assigned to the company's audit committee ahead of the offering. He continues to serve on the Coinbase board as a director.

=== Paradigm ===
In 2018, Ehrsam co-founded Paradigm, a research-driven cryptocurrency investment firm, with Matt Huang, a former partner at Sequoia Capital. The firm was established to invest in cryptocurrencies, tokens, and companies building on blockchain technology. Ehrsam and Huang served as the firm's co-managing partners.

In November 2021, Paradigm closed a $2.5 billion venture fund—the largest cryptocurrency-focused venture capital fund raised at the time—surpassing the $2.2 billion fund announced by Andreessen Horowitz earlier that year. The firm's portfolio has included investments in projects such as Uniswap, Optimism, and other decentralized finance protocols and blockchain infrastructure companies.

In October 2023, Ehrsam stepped down from his managing partner role at Paradigm and transitioned to the position of general partner, citing a desire to devote more time to exploring scientific areas of personal interest.

=== Nudge ===
In 2024, Ehrsam incorporated Nudge, a neurotechnology startup focused on developing non-invasive brain–computer interfaces using low-intensity focused ultrasound (LIFU). He co-founded the company with Quintin Frerichs and Jeremy Barenholtz, the latter a former vice president of product and technology at Neuralink. In April 2025, the company unveiled its first device, the Nudge Zero, a wearable ultrasound headset designed for brain stimulation and imaging within research settings.

In July 2025, Nudge raised $100 million in a Series A funding round led by Thrive Capital and Greenoaks. As of mid-2025, the company reported that the Nudge Zero was in near-daily use in research studies, with patient applications expected to follow. The company has stated that its longer-term vision includes developing a consumer headset-like product intended to improve mood, cognition, and sleep.

=== Other roles ===
In 2026, Ehrsam was appointed to the President's Council of Advisors on Science and Technology (PCAST) by President Donald Trump.

== See also ==
- Olaf Carlson-Wee
- Sam Bankman-Fried
