= Kai Carlson-Wee =

American poet and filmmaker

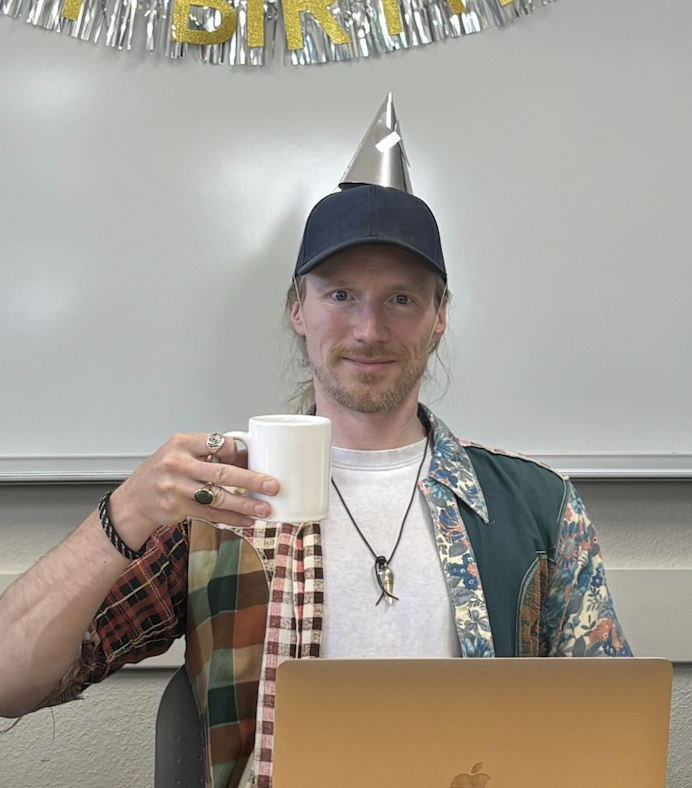
- Carlson-Wee Lecturing at Stanford 2026
- Born: May 20, 1982 (age 44); Minneapolis, Minnesota
- Education: University of Minnesota, University of Wisconsin, University of Oxford
- Notable work: 'RAIL', 'Riding the Highline'
- Website: www.kaicarlsonwee.com

Kai Carlson-Wee is an American poet and filmmaker. He is the author of the poetry collection RAIL, published by BOA Editions in 2018. He is a Jones Lecturer in creative writing at Stanford University.

== Biography ==
Carlson-Wee was born in Minneapolis, Minnesota, the son of Lutheran pastors. He has two younger brothers, poet Anders Carlson-Wee and Olaf Carlson-Wee, entrepreneur and the founder of Polychain Capital. After graduating from High School in Moorhead, Minnesota, Carlson-Wee moved to San Diego to pursue a career as a professional rollerblader. He attended Grossmont Community College in El Cajon, before attending the University of Minnesota in Minneapolis, and St. Catherine's College at Oxford University, where he studied Romantic Poetry. During his time in college, he struggled with mental health issues and was prescribed mood stabilizers and anti-psychotic medication, stating that after seven months of treatment, "my thoughts returned to normal and I was able to read again." Following college, Carlson-Wee traveled extensively throughout the United States, train hopping, hitchhiking, road tripping, and hiking in the North Cascades. He also traveled throughout Europe and lived at the Shakespeare and Company bookstore in Paris. In interviews, he has stated that traveling became the subject matter of much of his writing and filmmaking.

== Career and notable works ==
Carlson-Wee received an MFA in Poetry from the University of Wisconsin-Madison in 2011. He was awarded a Wallace Stegner Fellowship at Stanford University in 2011, and a Jones Lectureship in Poetry in 2013. In 2014 he won the Editor's Prize from The Missouri Review, and in 2023 he received a Pushcart Prize. Carlson-Wee's writing has been published in The Kenyon Review, Tin House, Ploughshares, The Academy of American Poets, Literary Hub, and The Southern Review. His photography has been featured in Narrative Magazine. With his brother Anders, he has co-authored the chapbooks Mercy Songs and Two-Headed Boy.

His debut collection of poems, RAIL, was published by BOA Editions in 2018, and was praised for its "authentic voice" and "gritty" depictions of life on the road. In the foreword to the book, Nick Flynn describes it as "biblical" and compares it to works by Larry Levis and Sam Shephard. Publishers Weekly praised the book for its "un-performative americana" and moments of "brutal lyric beauty". Campell McGrath named Carlson-Wee a "worthy inheritor" of "the great American bardic tradition", comparing him to Walt Whitman and Jack Kerouac.

His documentary film, Riding the Highline, received the Special Jury Prize at the Napa Valley Film Festival, the Audience Choice Award at the Arizona International Film Festival, and the Shoestring Award at the Rochester International Film Festival. The film follows Carlson-Wee and his brother hopping freight trains on the Burlington Highline route from Minneapolis, Minnesota to Wenatchee, Washington.

== Writing approach and style ==
Carlson-Wee's writing explores themes of travel, mental health, and the myth of the American West. He writes in a narrative lyric mode and employs long lines and anapestic meter to approximate the rhythm of a train. Carlson-Wee has said he often writes while traveling, and his poems are composed of "loose fragments" scribbled in his journals. Carlson-Wee stated he's been influenced by the imagist poets, particularly the poet Robert Bly, who described his debut collection as "strong and inspired". He has also been influenced by the dirty realism writers of the 1980s, and by photographers such as Alec Soth and Michael Brodie. He has been compared to Bob Dylan and Bruce Springsteen in his tales of "nomadic vagabonds" and "unmoored drifters searching for a home", and his work has been praised as an authentic depiction of rural lives and stories.

== Awards and honors ==
Year	Honor	Medium	Organization
2023	Pushcart Prize	Poetry	Pushcart Press
2018	Walter E. Dakin Fellowship	Writing	The Sewanee Writer's Workshop
2018	Lynda Hull Memorial Prize	Poetry	Crazyhorse Magazine
2018	Finalist for Balconies Prize	Poetry	Austin Community College
2017	Best New Poets	Poetry	New England Review
2017	Shoestring Award	Film	Rochester International Film Festival
2017	Winter Story Contest (2nd Place)	Writing	Narrative Magazine
2016	Award for Creative Achievement	Film	Arizona International Film Festival
2015	Special Jury Prize for Innovation	Film	Napa Valley Film Fest
2015	MacDowell Fellowship	Writing	MacDowell
2014	Editor's Prize, The Missouri Review	Writing	The Missouri Review
2013- Present	Jones Lectureship	Writing	Stanford University
2011- 2013	Wallace Stegner Fellowship	Writing	Stanford University
2012	Dorothy Sargent Rosenburg Prize	Poetry	Dorothy Sargent Rosenberg Memorial Fund
