= Ribbit Capital =

American venture capital firm

Ribbit Management Company, LLC
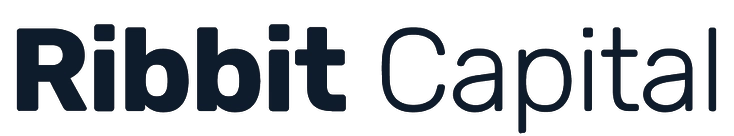
- Type: Private
- Industry: Venture Capital
- Founded: 2012; 14 years ago
- Founders: Micky Malka
- Headquarters: Palo Alto, California
- AUM: US$12 billion (2024)
- Number of employees: 31 (2024)
- Website: ribbitcap.com

Ribbit Capital is an American venture capital firm based in Palo Alto, California. Founded in 2012 by Venezuelan entrepreneur Micky Malka, the firm invests globally in primarily financial technology companies.

Ribbit is known for early and growth investments in fintech businesses including Robinhood Markets, Coinbase and Nubank. In 2021, it partnered with Walmart to launch the fintech venture One; the startup was valued around $2.5 billion in 2024. In 2020, the firm sponsored the special-purpose acquisition company Ribbit LEAP, which was liquidated in 2022 with proceeds returned to investors.

As of 2024, the firm reported approximately US$12 billion in regulatory assets under management and 31 employees, according to filings with the U.S. Securities and Exchange Commission.

== History ==
Ribbit Capital was founded in 2012 by Venezuelan entrepreneur Micky Malka to invest in financial services technology. The firm's name derives from the Hebrew work for ribit (interest).

Ribbit began fundraising for its first fund in February 2012 and announced it was completed in January 2013. Investors included Banco Bilbao Vizcaya Argentaria and Silicon Valley Bank. The fund raised $100 million which would be invested in startups related to financial services across the globe. It was expected to invest in 12 to 15 companies primarily in Series A and B rounds.

In 2013 after the first fund was raised, Ribbit Became an early proponent of cryptocurrencies, investing some of the money directly in Bitcoin as well as the exchange Coinbase.

Ribbit grew rapidly and by 2015, it had secured $446 million from investors which was the fourth-largest amount raised among all US venture capital firms since 2012. Its investor based grew to include institutional investors such as Sequoia Capital and ICONIQ Capital and individuals such as David Lawee and Sheryl Sandberg. While the firm made lucrative investments such as Credit Karma, it had also missed out on others such as TransferWise. Ribbit established a reputation as a venture capital firm in the world of fintech.

Ribbit launched a Special-purpose acquisition company (SPAC) named Ribbit Leap that held its initial public offering (IPO) on the New York Stock Exchange in September 2020. However the SPAC was not able to find a merger partner and in August 2022 it was liquidated with Ribbit returning $403 million to investors. Scrutiny from the U.S. Securities and Exchange Commission was cited as one of the reasons for abandoning the merger search.

In January 2021, Walmart announced it entered a partnership with Ribbit to create a new fintech startup to further expand its financial services offerings. It would be majority-owned by Walmart. The startup is named One and in December 2024, it had a valuation of $2.5 billion after Walmart and Ribbit lead a $300 million funding round.

Robinhood Markets is Ribbit's biggest investment to date where since 2014, it has invested over $500 million in the company. In February 2021. Ribbit led an emergency funding round of $3.4 billion for Robinhood Markets which was the largest since the company's inception in 2013. This came shortly after the GameStop short squeeze where Robinhood Markets needed cash urgently to put up collateral. The deal stated that Ribbit and other investors would be able convert the debt into equity at a discount to Robinhood Market's future IPO price.

Since 2022, several Ribbit employees have spun off to start investment firms, including Salvador Gala founding Escape Velocity (EV3), Ray Chua founding Fortwest Capital, and Nick Huber founding Spice Expeditions.

== See also ==
- Pantera Capital
- Paradigm Operations
- Polychain Capital
