= Mara (technology company) =

African Technology Company

- Company type: Privately held company
- Industry: Financial services
- Founded: 2021
- Founders: Chi Nnadi; Lucas Llinás Múnera; Dearg OBartuin
- Area served: Africa (Nigeria, Kenya)
- Key people: Chi Nnadi (CEO)
- Products: Cryptocurrency exchange, cryptocurrencies
- Number of employees: 51 - 200 (2022)
- Website: https://www.coinmara.com/

Mara is a pan-African financial technology, cryptocurrency, blockchain, and cryptoeconomy company.

== History ==
Mara was founded in 2021 by Chi Nnadi, Lucas Llinás Múnera, and Dearg OBartuin. The Mara executive team is led by Chi Nnadi (Co-Founder and CEO), Dearg OBartuin, and Yana Afanasieva, and joined by board advisors Kojo Annan and Tatiana Koffman. Mara announced its entry into Nigeria and Kenya in May 2022.

In May 2022, Mara also announced $23 million in funding from Coinbase Ventures, Distributed Global, TQ Ventures, DIGITAL, Nexo, Huobi Ventures, Day One Ventures, Infinite Capital, DAO Jones, and nearly 100 other crypto investors.

In May 2022, Mara was also named crypto partner of the Central African Republic and adviser to her president on crypto strategy and planning.

In October 2022, Mara announced the launch of their flagship product, Mara Wallet, which enables users to buy, sell, hold, and transfer crypto-assets.

== Partnership ==
In September 2022, Mara Foundation partnered with Circle to organize a roadshow and hackathon aimed at increasing awareness of the potential of stablecoins and blockchain adoption as well as at educating developers and non-developers across Africa.

In October 2022, the Ghana Football Association announced Mara as an official sponsor of the Black Stars of Ghana ahead of the FIFA World Cup Qatar 2022.
