= Polychain Capital =

American investment firm

Polychain Capital LP
- Type: Private
- Industry: Investment management
- Founded: 2016; 10 years ago
- Founder: Olaf Carlson-Wee
- Headquarters: San Francisco, California, U.S.
- Products: Hedge Funds; Venture Capital
- AUM: US$5 billion (2024)
- Number of employees: 32 (2024)
- Website: Official website

Polychain Capital LP, doing business as Polychain, is an American investment firm based in San Francisco, California. The firm focuses on investments related to cryptocurrency and blockchain technology.

== Background ==
Polychain Capital was founded in 2016 by Olaf Carlson-Wee. Prior to founding Polychain, Carlson-Wee was the first employee at Coinbase where he was Head of Risk.

Polychain initially operated as a hedge fund focus on blockain-based digital tokens.

Investors of Polychain include Andreessen Horowitz, Sequoia Capital, Union Square Ventures and Founders Fund.

In January 2018, the firm considered holding an initial public offering on the Toronto Stock Exchange to raise $325 million but eventually decided not to proceed with it.

The firm had more than $1 billion in assets under management in early 2018 but its assets declined to $591.5 million as of the end of that year, mainly because of a drop in the value of its holdings.

In May 2024, Polychain made distributions from two of its venture capital funds, including 44% of Polyventures II, a fund that had raised about $300 million in 2019.

Companies that Polychain Capital has invested in include Coinbase, Kik Messenger and Tezos.

== See also ==
- Pantera Capital
- Paradigm Operations
