= Ripple Labs =

American technology company

Ripple Labs, Inc.

- CEO Brad Garlinghouse in 2018
- Type: Private
- Industry: Computer software
- Founded: 2012
- Founders: Chris Larsen; Jed McCaleb
- Headquarters: 600 Battery Street, San Francisco, California, United States; 37°47′50.7″N 122°24′1.6″W
- Number of locations: 15+ offices (2026)
- Area served: Worldwide
- Key people: David Schwartz (Board member); Brad Garlinghouse (Chief Executive Officer); Monica Long (President)
- Products: Ripple Payment and Exchange Network
- Number of employees: 1,120 (2023)
- Website: ripple.com

Ripple Labs, Inc., known as Ripple, is an American technology company which offers enterprise blockchain products on the XRP Ledger and other networks. The company was founded in 2012 and is based in San Francisco, California. It was established as NewCoin in September 2012, renamed OpenCoin the following month, and adopted the name Ripple Labs in 2013. In October 2015, it shortened its public-facing brand to Ripple. The company uses the cryptocurrency XRP and its U.S. dollar-backed stablecoin, Ripple USD (RLUSD), to support cross-border payments and liquidity provision.

The firm has been investigated by the U.S. Securities and Exchange Commission (SEC) for various violations. The company has made substantial political donations to Donald Trump and entered into partnerships with Trump's businesses. During the second Donald Trump administration, the SEC softened its regulation of the company.

== History ==
=== 2011–2015: Origins and early history ===
In 2011, engineers David Schwartz and Jed McCaleb began developing a financial infrastructure similar to bitcoin that would use substantially less energy and reduce transaction time. In September 2012, Chris Larsen and McCaleb co-founded NewCoin, which was renamed OpenCoin the following month.

On April 11, 2013, OpenCoin announced it had closed an angel round of funding with several venture capital firms. That same month, OpenCoin acquired SimpleHoney to help it popularize virtual currencies and make them easier for average users.

On September 26, 2013, OpenCoin officially changed its name to Ripple Labs, Inc. On October 6, 2015, the company was rebranded from Ripple Labs to Ripple.

=== 2018–present: Introduction of banking sector products and international expansion ===
In March 2018, a Japanese bank consortium led by SBI Ripple Asia, comprising 61 banks, launched "MoneyTap", a Ripple-powered mobile app to provide on-demand domestic payments in Japan. In May 2018, Spanish Banking group Santander released One Pay FX — the first mobile application for international payments powered by blockchain technology, that uses Ripple's xCurrent technology. XCurrent is not a blockchain or any form of distributed ledger. Ripple CTO David Schwartz described it as "bi-directional messaging" that can eventually plug into distributed ledgers. Following the creation of a Mumbai office, Ripple added multiple Indian customers in 2018, including leading banks such as Kotak Mahindra Bank, Axis Bank, and IndusInd, that announced that they started using Ripple's products. Ripple's CEO predicted that by end of 2018 "major banks" would be using Ripple tools that made use of the XRP cryptocurrency and that by end of 2019 "dozens" of banks would be using XRP. However, neither of those predictions came to pass in the specified time frame.

In October 2020, Ripple board member Ken Kurson resigned from the company when he was charged with committing a range of cyber-crimes by the United States Attorney for the southern district of New York.

In May 2023, Ripple acquired Switzerland-based crypto custody firm Metaco for $250 million. In addition to expanding its potential customer base, the purchase also expanded the company's international presence during a time of increased scrutiny by the SEC towards U.S. cryptocurrency companies. In June 2023, Ripple received approval for a license from the central bank of Singapore to offer regulated digital payment token products and services.

In April 2024, Forbes referred to it as a "crypto zombie" noting the company was not making progress in disrupting SWIFT, in 2023 generated $583,000 in fees, and that the company has $24 billion worth of XRP tokens in escrow that it could sell over the following four years.

Ripple acquired four companies in late 2025. In August, the company acquired the stablecoin payment firm, Rail, for $200 million. Two months later, Ripple announced the acquisition of Hidden Road, a multi-asset prime broker, for $1.25 billion, and GTreasury, a global treasury management system, for $1 billion. The following month, Ripple announced the acquisition of Palisade, a digital asset custody firm, for an undisclosed sum. Between 2023 and 2025, Ripple contributed $4 billion to the cryptocurrency industry through acquisitions and business tradings. In January 2026, Ripple Treasury acquired Solvexia, a financial automation provider, for an undisclosed sum. Two months later, Ripple announced the acquisition of BC Payments Australia, a payments subsidiary of Banking Circle, also for an undisclosed sum.

Following a major security breach of Binance involving cryptocurrency assets valued at an estimated US$6.3 billion in October 2026, the largest cryptocurrency theft on record at that time, Ripple froze approximately US$200 million in related assets.

==== Ripple Treasury (formerly GTreasury) ====
In October 2025, Ripple announced its acquisition of GTreasury, a Chicago-based treasury management system (TMS) company, for approximately US$1 billion. Founded in 1986, GTreasury developed software for liquidity management, cash forecasting, payments, multilateral netting and risk management, and reported serving more than 1,000 customers across 160 countries. By 2025, the business processed approximately US$12.5 trillion in payments annually. GTreasury had been majority-owned by Hg since 2023, with Mainsail Partners retaining a minority interest; both firms exited their investments in the Ripple transaction. Ripple announced its intent to combine GTreasury's treasury-management technology with its own digital-asset infrastructure. Later in January 2026, Ripple launched Ripple Treasury, integrating GTreasury's treasury-management software with Ripple's digital-asset infrastructure. The platform supports Ripple's stablecoin RLUSD and access to overnight repo markets through Ripple Prime, the prime-brokerage business formerly known as Hidden Road. Ripple Treasury also provides access to tokenized money-market funds, including BlackRock's BUIDL.

Before joining Ripple, GTreasury had expanded its treasury-management platform through a series of acquisitions. In 2018, it acquired Visual Risk, a Sydney-based treasury and risk-management software and consulting company that had been identified by the Australian Financial Review in 2015 as one of 14 companies illustrating the development of Australia's fintech sector. The acquisition combined GTreasury's cash and liquidity-management software with Visual Risk's financial-risk analytics and expanded GTreasury's operations in the Asia-Pacific market. GTreasury subsequently acquired Coprocess, a provider of intercompany netting software, in 2021, hedge-accounting software and consulting company Hedge Trackers in 2022, and cash-forecasting software company CashAnalytics in 2024. These acquisitions added multilateral netting, hedge accounting and cash-forecasting capabilities, respectively. Reported customers included American Airlines, Subway, Christian Louboutin, Hanesbrands, and Jost.

On 6 January 2026, GTreasury announced its acquisition of Solvexia, an Australian SaaS company established and headquartered in Bondi Junction, Sydney, that provides no-code automation software for financial, tax, and compliance processes, serving the banking, life insurance, and travel sectors. The acquisition added reconciliation, regulatory-reporting and financial-automation capabilities to GTreasury's platform. Financial terms of the transaction were not disclosed. The platform was initially oriented toward the insurance sector. The company provided a risk analytics workflow with built-in audit and control in cloud data centres. The underlying technology was designed to be applicable across other financial services functions beyond insurance.

== Funding round (securities offering) ==
Ripple is a privately funded company. It has closed five rounds of funding, which included two rounds of angel funding, one round of seed funding, one Series A round, one Series B round and one Series C round.

Date	Funding type	Investor	Amount (million $)
April 2013	Angel	Andreessen Horowitz, FF Angel LLC, Lightspeed Venture Partners, Pantera Capital, Vast Ventures, Bitcoin Opportunity Fund	2.5
May 2013	Angel	Google Ventures, IDG Capital Partners	3.0
November 2013	Seed	Core Innovation Capital, Venture51, Camp One Ventures, IDG Capital Partners	3.5
May 2015	Series A	IDG Capital Partners, Seagate Technology, AME Cloud Ventures, ChinaRock Capital Management, China Growth Capital, Wicklow Capital, Bitcoin Opportunity Corp, Core Innovation Capital, Route 66 Ventures, RRE Ventures, Vast Ventures, Venture 51	28
October 2015	Series A	Santander InnoVentures	4
September 2016	Series B	Standard Chartered, Accenture, SCB Digital Ventures, SBI Holdings, Santander InnoVentures, CME Group, Seagate Technology	55
December 2019	Series C	Tetragon, SBI Holdings, Route 66 Ventures	200
November 2025	Strategic investment	Brevan Howard, Fortress Investment Group, Galaxy Digital, Marshall Wace, Pantera Capital, and affiliates of Citadel Securities	500

== Partnerships and initiatives ==
In March 2014, CrossCoin Ventures launched an accelerator which funds companies that work to advance the Ripple ecosystem. The firm funds accepted startups with up to US$50,000 (equivalent to $68,000 in 2025) in XRP, Ripple's native currency, in exchange for a 3% to 6% stake in diluted common stock. Mentorship and support is provided by CrossCoin and Ripple Labs, Inc.

Ripple also developed early partnerships with companies such as ZipZap.

Ripple Labs was a co-founding member of the Digital Asset Transfer Authority (DATA) in July 2013. DATA provides best practices and technical standards, including anti–money laundering compliance guidance for companies that work with digital currency and other alternative payments systems.

In 2018, Ripple donated a quantity of XRP valued at $29 million to USA public schools.

In March 2019, Ripple announced a $100 Million fund for gaming developers which would be overseen by Forte Labs.

== Recognition ==
For its creation and development of the Ripple protocol (RTXP) and the Ripple payment/exchange network, the magazine MIT Technology Review listed Ripple Labs as one of 2014s "50 Smartest Companies" in its February 2014 issue. The criteria for the recognition revolved around "whether a company had made strides in the past year that will define its field."

== Regulatory and legal matters ==
=== FinCEN enforcement action, BitLicense, and R3 litigation (2015–2020) ===
On May 5, 2015, Ripple received a US$700,000 civil penalty from the U.S. Treasury's Financial Crimes Enforcement Network (FinCEN) for "willful violation of the Bank Secrecy Act by acting as a money services business without registering with FinCEN". The company agreed to remedial steps to ensure future compliance, including an agreement to only transact XRP and "Ripple Trade" activity through registered money services businesses (MSB), among other agreements such as enhancing the Ripple Protocol.

On June 13, 2016, XRP II LLC, an affiliate of Ripple Labs, received a BitLicense from the New York State Department of Financial Services. It was the second BitLicense issued by the regulator.

In September 2017, blockchain startup R3 sued Ripple for specific performance of an option agreement in which Ripple agreed to sell up to five billion XRPs (the native cryptocurrency of Ripple protocol) for a price of $.0085. Ripple countersued, claiming that R3 reneged on contractual promises, and was merely acting on opportunism, after the cryptocurrency increased in value more than 30 times. In September 2018, Ripple and R3 reached an undisclosed settlement agreement.

A February 2020 article in Financial Times Alphaville reported that MoneyGram, the largest public user of Ripple's XRP based liquidity tools, had received a $50m investment prior to adopting the tools and also that the software was provided free of charge by Ripple and that MoneyGram was receiving an on-going subsidy for using XRP, amounting to $8.9m in Q4 2019. The same article indicated that Ripple was dependent on sales of XRP to remain profitable.

=== SEC litigation (2020–2025) ===
On December 22, 2020, the U.S. Securities and Exchange Commission filed a civil lawsuit against Ripple and two of its executives in the United States District Court for the Southern District of New York, alleging that their offers and sales of XRP violated the registration provisions of the Securities Act of 1933. The SEC alleged that Ripple had raised more than $1.3 billion through unregistered offers and sales of XRP, that co-founder Chris Larsen and CEO Brad Garlinghouse had aided and abetted Ripple's violations, and that the executives' own XRP sales also violated the registration requirements. In April 2021, Magistrate Judge Sarah Netburn granted a motion by Garlinghouse and Larsen to quash SEC requests for personal financial records beyond the XRP transaction records they had agreed to produce.

On July 13, 2023, Judge Analisa Torres issued a summary judgment granting each side's motion in part. The court distinguished XRP itself from the circumstances of its sale. It held that Ripple's institutional sales constituted unregistered offers and sales of investment contracts, but that its programmatic sales on digital asset exchanges did not satisfy the requirement that purchasers reasonably expect profits to be derived from the efforts of others. It also held that certain other distributions did not satisfy the investment-of-money requirement, and that Larsen's and Garlinghouse's own exchange-based sales did not constitute offers and sales of investment contracts. The court did not decide whether secondary-market sales of XRP constituted offers and sales of investment contracts because that issue was not before it. In October 2023, the SEC dismissed with prejudice its remaining claims that Garlinghouse and Larsen had aided and abetted Ripple's unlawful institutional sales.

On August 7, 2024, Torres entered final judgment against Ripple for its institutional sales of XRP, imposing a civil penalty of $125,035,150 and an injunction against future violations of the securities-registration requirements. In 2025, the parties sought court approval to dissolve the injunction and reduce the penalty payable to the SEC to $50 million, but Torres rejected the request, finding that they had not demonstrated exceptional circumstances sufficient to modify the final judgment. On August 7, 2025, the SEC and Ripple dismissed their respective appeals.

On March 17, 2026, the SEC issued a new interpretation of the application of federal securities laws to crypto assets and related transactions, accompanied by guidance from the Commodity Futures Trading Commission (CFTC). The interpretation, published in the Federal Register on March 23, identified XRP, alongside bitcoin, ether, solana and stellar, as examples of digital commodities whose value at that time derived from functioning crypto systems and supply and demand rather than expectations of profits from others' essential managerial efforts. It also stated that a crypto asset that is not itself a security can nevertheless be offered or sold as part of an investment contract, depending on the circumstances of the transaction.

== Political activities ==
In December 2023, Ripple contributed $25 million towards the establishment of a super PAC called Fairshake, along with two affiliated super PACs, collectively raising $78 million from cryptocurrency industry companies, executives and investors. In May 2024, Axios reported that CEO Brad Garlinghouse had announced the donation by Ripple of an additional $25 million, with a pledge to give $25 million more each year for "as long as there are crypto naysayers slandering the industry". The Hill reported that more than $10 million of the super PAC's spending went toward opposing the California Democratic Senate primary bid of Katie Porter, who lost in the March 2024 primary. As of June 2024, CNBC reported that Fairshake had backed the winning candidate in 33 of the 35 House and Senate primary races it had entered.

In May 2025, Politico reported that Ripple Labs had hired the Washington lobbying firm Ballard Partners, a firm closely connected to the Trump administration. The article noted that a Ballard associate had drafted a social-media post promoting the cryptocurrency XRP and that President Trump later expressed anger after discovering Ripple’s engagement with Ballard.

Ripple donated $5 million to Trump's 2025 inaugural. In 2025, Ripple was one of the donors who funded the White House's East Wing demolition, and planned building of a ballroom.

In 2026, Ripple donated $48 million to Fairshake and $1 million to support Republican John Deaton in the 2026 United States Senate election in Massachusetts.
