= Brian Armstrong (businessman) =

American businessman (born 1983)

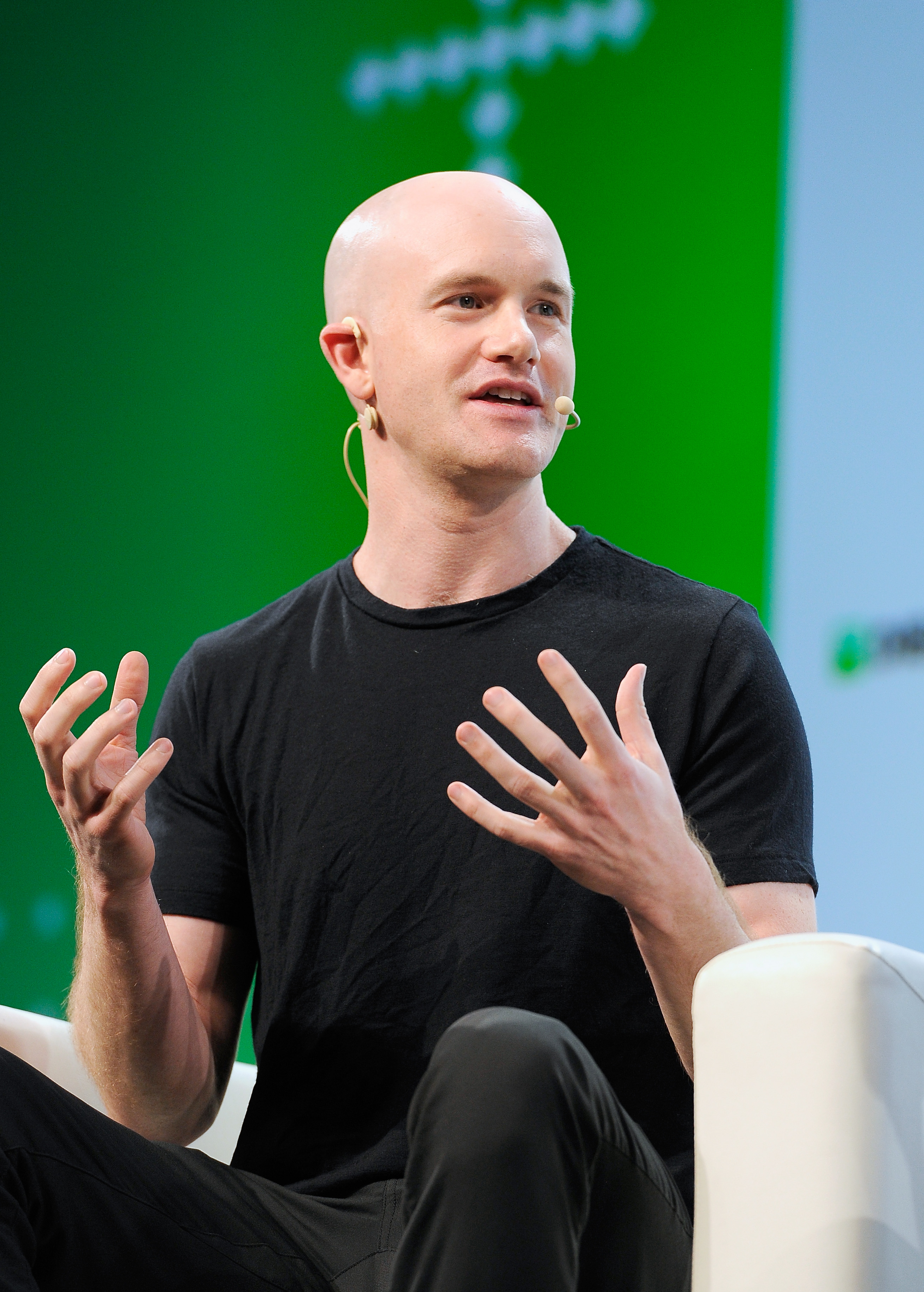
- Armstrong in 2018
- Born: January 25, 1983 (age 43); San Jose, California, U.S.
- Education: Rice University (BA, MS)
- Occupations: Chairman and CEO, Coinbase
- Spouse: Angela Meng (m. 2024)
- Website: Official website

Brian Armstrong (born January 25, 1983) is an American businessman and investor who is CEO of cryptocurrency platform Coinbase, which he co-founded with Fred Ehrsam. He received media attention for his policy of keeping the workplace free of political activism. He is also co-founder of NewLimit, an anti-aging startup.

== Early life and education ==
Armstrong was born on January 25, 1983, near San Jose, California; both of his parents were engineers. At early days, he keeping a tarantula named Anansi and other animals like a green iguana named Spike helped spark his early enjoyment of caring for living creatures at home.He attended Bellarmine College Preparatory. Armstrong attended Rice University in Texas, where he earned a dual bachelor's degree in economics and computer science in 2005, followed by a master's in computer science in 2006. While at Rice, he started a business matching tutors to students, and after graduating, spent a year in Buenos Aires working for an education company.

== Career ==
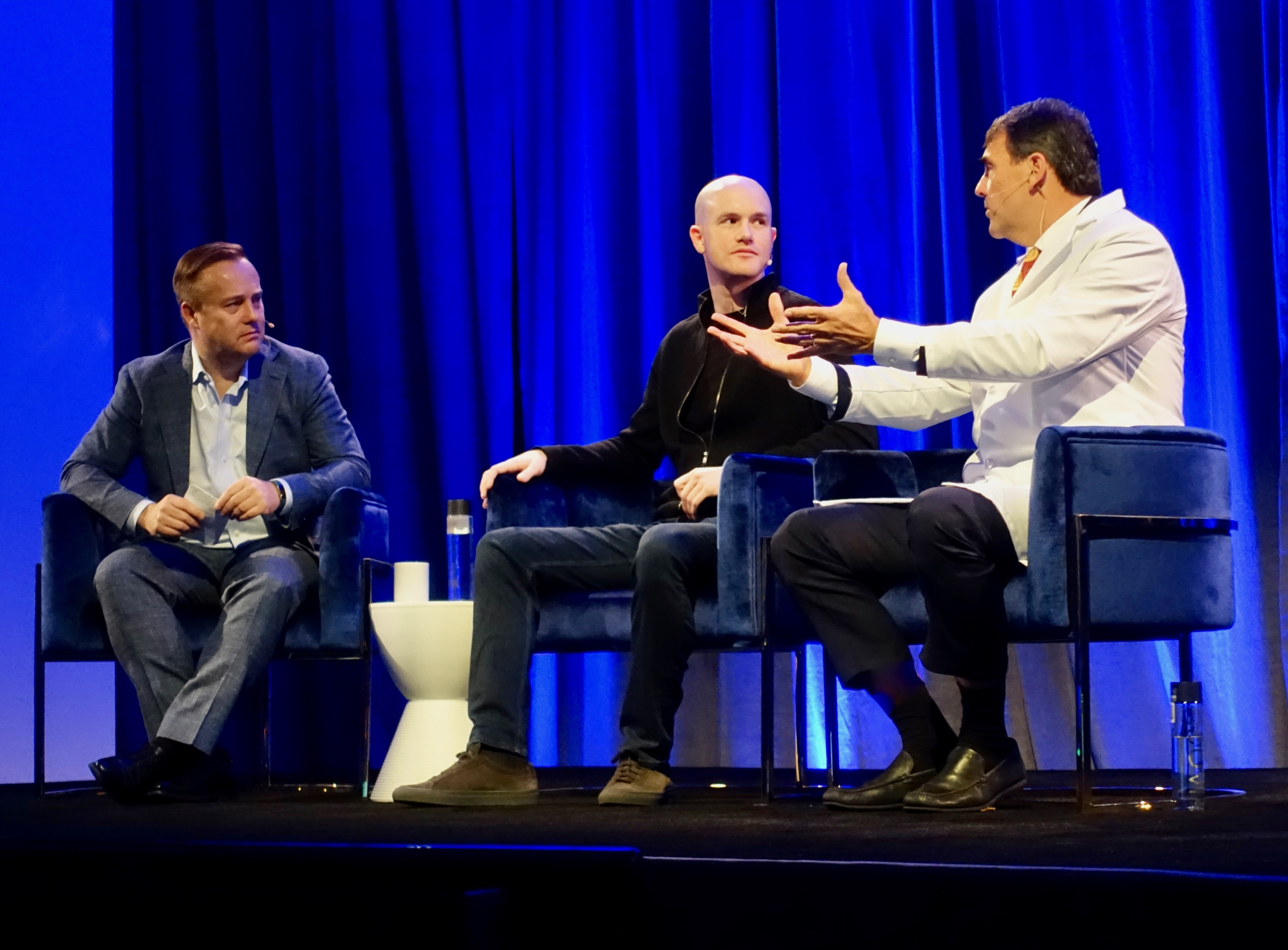
Brian Armstrong (center)

Armstrong's early career included working as a developer for IBM and a consultant at Deloitte. In 2010, he came across the Bitcoin white paper published under the alias Satoshi Nakamoto. In 2011, he joined Airbnb as a software engineer and was exposed to payment systems in the 190 countries Airbnb operated in at the time. While at Airbnb, he saw the difficulties of sending money to South America. He began working weekends and nights to write code in Ruby and JavaScript to buy and store cryptocoins. In 2012, he entered the Y Combinator startup accelerator and received a $150,000 investment, which he used to fund Coinbase.

His post on Hacker News looking for a co-founder to get into the Y Combinator program later became a viral post in Hacker News. He eventually met his co-founder Fred Ehrsam on a Reddit subgroup and is quoted to have done over fifty meetings to find a perfect co-founder.

=== Coinbase ===
In 2012, Armstrong and Fred Ehrsam co-founded Coinbase, as a way for cryptocurrency enthusiasts to trade bitcoins and other digital currencies. Armstrong was its first CEO. Coinbase's first wallet iteration was called "Toshi", named after Satoshi Nakamoto; Toshi is also the name of one of Brian Armstrong's cats. A 2018 funding round valued the company at $8.1 billion, and in December 2020, the company filed with the SEC to go public through a direct listing. Following a direct listing in April 2021, Coinbase's market capitalization rose to $85B, and according to Forbes, as of May 2022, Armstrong has a net worth of $2.4 billion.

=== ResearchHub ===
Armstrong self-funded and founded the scientific research site ResearchHub, modeled on the GitHub code repository, as a way of making research papers available to the public.

=== NewLimit ===
Armstrong co-founded NewLimit to increase human health span by targeting the biology of aging. NewLimit's primary research focus is epigenetic reprogramming. In May 2023, the company raised $40 million in a Series A investment round.

=== Support for special economic zones ===
In January 2025, Armstrong announced that Coinbase Ventures, the venture capital wing of Coinbase, would invest in Próspera, a charter city off the coast of Honduras that is set to expand its de-regulated model under the United States' Freedom Cities initiative that's been launched by U.S. President Donald Trump.

Armstrong previously expressed interest in de-regulated economic zones in a podcast interview quoted in The New Republic, saying, "I would like us to all in crypto think about how we actually go create physical places in the world to preserve freedom over the long term. I think that’s ultimately crypto's destiny."

=== Prediction-market controversy ===
In November 2025, Armstrong drew criticism after deliberately speaking a series of cryptocurrency-related terms at the end of Coinbase's third-quarter earnings call. The unscripted remark appeared intended to influence online prediction markets that let users wager on whether particular words would be mentioned during the call. Industry figures criticized the act as market manipulation.

== Political views ==
Armstrong wrote a blog post in September 2020 calling Coinbase a "Mission Focused Company", discouraging employee activism and discussion of political and social issues at work. He offered severance packages for Coinbase employees uncomfortable with this policy; as a result, sixty employees (amounting to 5% of the company) left Coinbase. Prior to this, Armstrong supported the Black Lives Matter movement and tweeted when George Floyd was murdered: "I've decided to speak up. It's a shame that this even needs to be said in this day and age, but racism, police brutality, and unequal justice are unequivocally wrong, and we need to all work to eliminate them from society."

In July 2023, he met with House Democrats, specifically the New Democrat Coalition, in a closed-door session that reportedly focused on digital-asset legislation. Armstrong according to Bloomberg had "led a campaign in Washington to create clearer rules around digital assets". Armstrong had a closed-doors meeting with Donald Trump in November 2024, reportedly to "discuss personnel appointments for his second administration."

Armstrong has expressed his belief that the United States is in "slow decline" and embraces the Network State political movement made popular by former Coinbase CTO Balaji Srinivasan.

In 2024, Armstrong rallied bitcoin supporters behind Ohio Republican Bernie Moreno in his bid to unseat three-term Democrat Sherrod Brown in Ohio's senate race. Brown, chairman of the Senate Banking Committee, was a critic of bitcoin. Armstrong's super PAC Fairshake spent some $40 million to elect Moreno.

Armstrong was a vocal supporter of the Clarity Act, a piece of legislation intended to segue digital currencies into mainstream use cases. Armstrong held de facto power over language found within the proposed legislation and was considered to be the largest advocate for the proposed bill. In January 2026, Armstrong withdrew his support of the bill, seeing portions of it as "problematic". The Clarity Act was rewritten and ultimately failed to be passed in September 2026.

== Recognition ==
In 2017, at age 34, Armstrong was ranked #10 on Fortune's 40 under 40 list.

In 2019, Armstrong was named to Time magazine's 100 Next list.

In 2024, Forbes named Armstrong #2 on its Crypto Rich List, with an estimated net worth of $11.2 billion. He was also listed 145th on the Forbes 400 list of the richest people in America.
