= The Block (website) =

Digital currency data and news company

- Headquarters: New York City, New York, U.S.
- Area served: Worldwide
- Owner: Foresight Ventures
- Founders: Mike Dudas, Jake McGraw
- Editor: Adam James
- CEO: Larry Cermak
- Industry: Digital currency
- Website: www.theblock.co
- Launched: March 2018

The Block is an American online publication specializing in cryptocurrencies. It is based in New York City.

== History ==
The Block was founded by Mike Dudas at the beginning of 2018. It raised $4million from venture capital firms including Greycroft, Pantera Capital, BlockTower Capital and Bloomberg Beta.

In 2020, Mike Dudas stepped down and Michael McCaffrey became CEO, having taken an undisclosed loan of $12million from Alameda Research to buy out other investors and all former employees.

Over the next two years, McCaffrey took two more loans from Alameda Research. One for $15 million to finance the ongoing operations of The Block and another for $16 million to purchase personal real estate in the Bahamas.

After Alameda Research went bankrupt and McCaffrey's undisclosed loans totaling $43 million were revealed in December 2022, McCaffrey resigned and Bobby Moran, then CRO of The Block, became Interim CEO in November 2022. Moran said that no employee, apart from McCaffrey, knew about the loans from Alameda Research.

In March 2023, Larry Cermak became CEO and the company laid off a third of its staff.

In November 2023, The Block sold more than an 80% stake to Singapore-based Foresight Ventures in a $56 million deal at a $70 million valuation.

== Emergence event ==
The Block and Foresight Ventures hosted a conference called Emergence in Prague in December 2024. Former Czech Prime Minister Andrej Babiš and former Mayor of Prague Zdeněk Hřib spoke at the event.

== Digital Asset Outlook report ==
In December 2020, The Block released its first Digital Asset Outlook report covering the state of the market, investment trends, decentralized finance (DeFi), and other thematic trends to watch for in 2021. Similar reports were released at the end of each subsequent year.

== GMCI indices ==
The Block and crypto market maker Wintermute launched crypto index provider GMCI in February 2024. It provides 12 indices that track aspects of the crypto market, including sectors such as Layer 1 tokens and AI tokens. The GMCI 30 index represents a selection of the top 30 cryptocurrencies and is available on crypto exchanges Bitget and Woo X, as well as decentralized exchange Vertex.
