= Visual Risk =

Australian treasury management company

Visual Risk (now Ripple Treasury)
- Type: Privately Owned
- Industry: Financial services, Financial technology, Software
- Founded: 2001; 25 years ago
- Founders: Paul Nailand; Richard Hughes
- Headquarters: Sydney, Australia
- Parent: Ripple Treasury
- Website: www.visualrisk.com

Visual Risk was a treasury management software provider and consulting company headquartered in Sydney, New South Wales, Australia. Visual Risk is now part of Ripple Treasury and its software and services are now under the Ripple Treasury name. The company provides treasury and risk management software and specialises in market risk management.

== History ==
Visual Risk was one of Australia's original Fintech companies. The company is a treasury software provider. Visual Risk was founded by Richard Hughes and Paul Nailand, and is headquartered in Sydney. Richard Hughes and Paul Nailand currently serve as managing directors of Visual Risk.

In December 2015 Visual Risk won best Risk Management Solution in the Treasury Management International's 2015 awards, the awards are considered the benchmark in the industry.

In April 2018 GTreasury acquired Visual Risk and integrated Visual Risk's Risk Management software into its own offering to bolster its existing treasury and cash management tool. GTreasury was thereafter acquired by Ripple Labs and reconfigured into Ripple Treasury.

== Product ==
Visual Risk is a modular Treasury Risk Management system that consists of five modules: risk Analytics, asset-liability management, treasury management, hedge accounting, and cash and liquidity. This modular system can be used separately or as a fully integrated system. In addition, Visual Risk provides a reporting dashboard. The software is deployed either locally or via the cloud.

== Partnerships ==
In 2014, Visual Risk partnered with KPMG Australia. Visual Risk will analyse KPMG's hedging transactions and client exposures.
