= Anders Carlson-Wee =

American poet (born 1985)

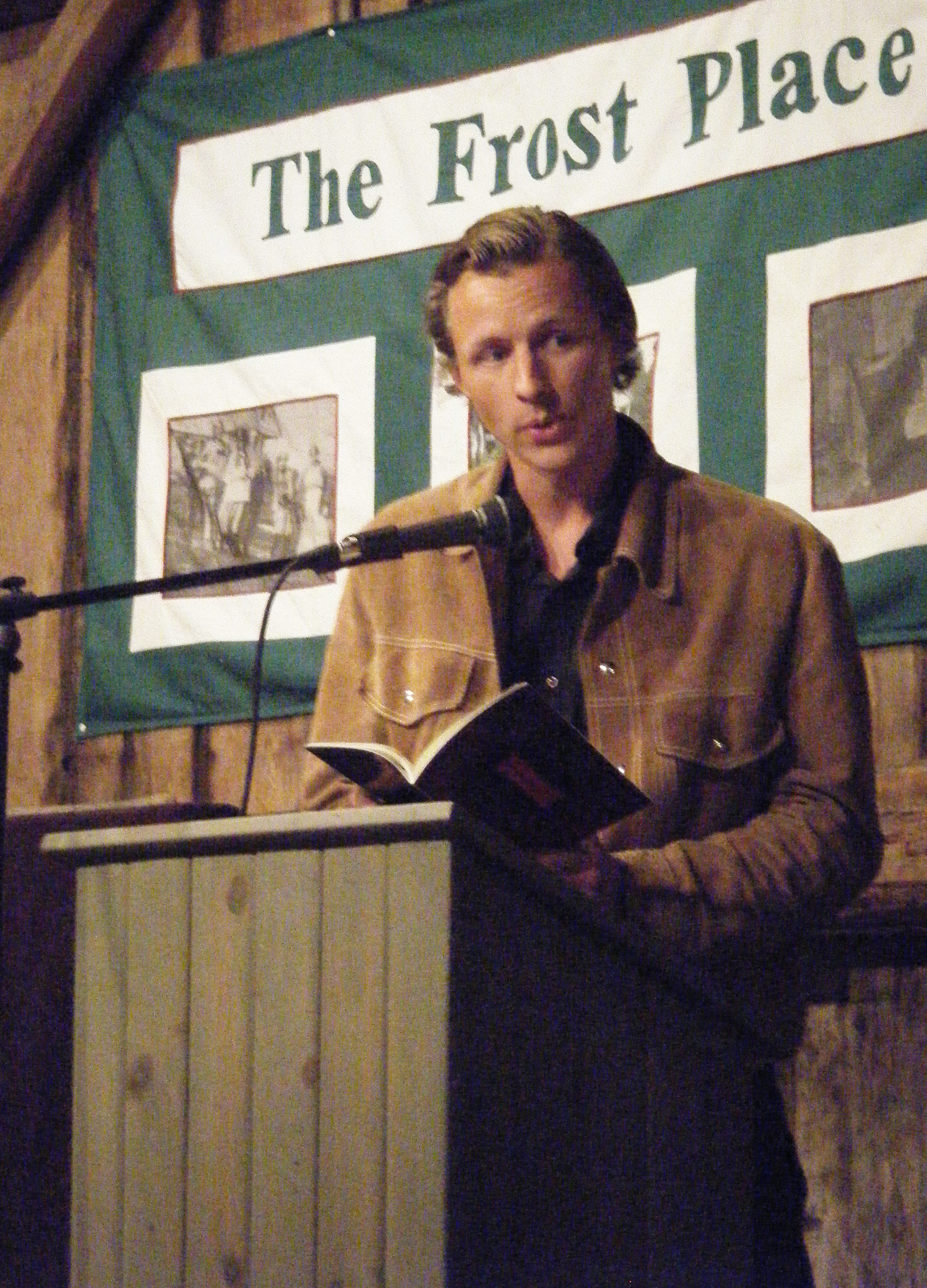
- Carlson-Wee Reading at The Frost Place in Franconia, NH in 2015.
- Born: May 18, 1985 (age 41); Minneapolis, Minnesota, U.S.
- Education: Fairhaven College; Vanderbilt University
- Writing career
- Genre: Poetry
- Notable works: Disease of Kings; The Low Passions
- Website: www.anderscarlsonwee.com

Anders Carlson-Wee is an American poet. His first collection, The Low Passions, was published by W. W. Norton & Company in 2019. Norton published his second collection, Disease of Kings, in 2023.

== Personal life ==
Carlson-Wee was born in Minneapolis, Minnesota to Lutheran pastor parents, and grew up in Moorhead, Minnesota. He is a former professional rollerblader, and has written extensively about dumpster diving, as well as hopping freight trains and traveling the country. He has dyslexia.

He has two brothers: poet and filmmaker Kai Carlson-Wee and entrepreneur Olaf Carlson-Wee.

== Career ==
Carlson-Wee studied at Fairhaven College of Western Washington University before earning his MFA at Vanderbilt University.

His poems have been published in various journals and magazines including The Paris Review, Harvard Review, BuzzFeed, The American Poetry Review, Ploughshares, and Virginia Quarterly Review.

Anders is co-director of the poetry film Riding the Highline, which has won numerous prizes at film festivals.

== Awards and fellowships ==
- National Endowment for the Arts Fellowship
- Poetry International Prize
- McKnight Artist Fellowship
- Frost Place Chapbook Prize

== Publications ==
- Disease of Kings, W. W. Norton & Company, 2023
- The Low Passions, W. W. Norton & Company, 2019
- Two Headed Boy with Kai Carlson-Wee, Organic Weapon Arts, 2016
- Mercy Songs with Kai Carlson-Wee, Diode Editions, 2016
- Dynamite, Bull City Press, 2015
