= Olaf Carlson-Wee =

American entrepreneur

- Born: 1989 (age 36–37); Northfield, Minnesota, United States
- Education: Vassar College
- Occupation: Entrepreneur

Olaf Carlson-Wee (born 1989) is an American entrepreneur and the CEO of cryptocurrency fund Polychain Capital, which he founded in 2016. He was the first employee of Coinbase. Carlson-Wee was named in the Forbes 30 Under 30 list in 2018.

Carlson-Wee has two brothers, who are both poets: Kai Carlson-Wee and Anders Carlson-Wee.

== Career ==
At Vassar College, Carlson-Wee studied sociology and wrote his undergraduate thesis on Bitcoin and open-source finance. After graduating from Vassar College in 2012, Carlson-Wee sent his thesis to Coinbase's founders and joined the cryptocurrency exchange Coinbase in 2013 as its first employee. He Initially worked in customer support and handled support by himself until Coinbase had about 250,000 users. He later became Coinbase's Head of Risk and was paid in bitcoin during his three years at the company.

In 2016, Carlson-Wee left Coinbase and founded Polychain Capital, a cryptocurrency investment firm focused on blockchain-based digital tokens. Polychain initially operated as a hedge fund investing in a diverse portfolio of blockchain-based cryptocurrency platforms, including networks such as Bitcoin and Ethereum. The fund launched in 2016 with approximately $5 million. The firm secured investments from venture capital firms including Andreessen Horowitz, Sequoia Capital, Union Square Ventures and Founders Fund. Polychain claimed $1 billion in assets in 2017 but the total dropped to $592 million at the end of 2018 as the value of its holdings fell. The firm managed assets worth $4 billion in April 2021.

In July 2017, Carlson-Wee appeared on the cover of Forbes with the cover line, "Craziest Bubble Ever". In 2018, he was named in the Forbes 30 Under 30 list. He featured in Fortune magazine's 40 Under 40 in 2018.

Carlson-Wee was again profiled as part of Forbes’s Blockchain 50 2022 and in a related Forbes video feature.

In a 2022 interview with David Pearce for Interview Magazine, Carlson-Wee discussed his ambitions to improve the world through technology following his success in the cryptocurrency sector, stating that his aim is to address "the deepest problems of the human condition through technological advancements."
