= Coinbase =

American digital asset exchange company

Coinbase Global, Inc.
- Type: Public
- Traded as: Nasdaq: COIN (Class A); S&P 500 component
- ISIN: US19260Q1076
- Industry: Cryptocurrency
- Founded: June 2012; 14 years ago, in San Francisco, California, U.S.
- Founders: Brian Armstrong; Fred Ehrsam
- Headquarters: San Francisco
- Area served: 100+ countries
- Key people: Brian Armstrong (Chair, CEO); Emilie Choi (President, COO); Alesia Haas (CFO)
- Products: List of products: Coinbase (app); Coinbase One; Coinbase Advanced; Coinbase Wallet; USD Coin; Coinbase Card; Coinbase Earn; Coinbase Business; Coinbase Commerce; Coinbase Custody; Coinbase Payments; Coinbase Prime; Coinbase Developer Platform
- Revenue: ▲US$7.18 billion (2025)
- Net income: ▼US$1.26 billion (2025)
- Total assets: ▲US$29.7 billion (2025)
- Total equity: ▲US$14.8 billion (2025)
- Owner: Brian Armstrong (19%)
- Members: 108 million (2023)
- Number of employees: ▲3,772 (2024)
- Website: coinbase.com

Coinbase Global, Inc. is an American cryptocurrency exchange. It was founded in 2012 by Brian Armstrong and Fred Ehrsam. Coinbase has over 100 million users, and is the largest U.S. based cryptocurrency exchange as well as the world's biggest bitcoin custodian, as of 2024. The company operates in more than 100 countries and holds nearly US$516 billion in assets, including nearly 12 percent of all bitcoin in existence and 11 percent of all staked Ether.

Described as a conservative and law-abiding cryptocurrency exchange, Coinbase offers cryptocurrency products and services. As of 2025, the company operates as a remote-first company with no physical headquarters.

== History ==
=== 2012–2019: founding and early years ===
Coinbase was founded in June 2012 by Brian Armstrong, a former Airbnb engineer. Armstrong enrolled in the Y Combinator startup incubator program and received a US$150,000 cash infusion. Fred Ehrsam, a former Goldman Sachs trader, later joined as a co-founder after noticing Armstrong's posts on Reddit. British programmer and Blockchain.info co-founder Ben Reeves was originally supposed to be part of the Coinbase founding team, but parted ways with Armstrong just before the Y Combinator funding event, due to their different stands on how the Coinbase wallet should operate. The company is named after coinbase transactions, which are special transactions that introduce cryptocurrency into circulation in proof of work cryptocurrencies. In October 2012, the company launched the services to buy and sell bitcoins through bank transfers.

In May 2013, Coinbase received a US$5 million Series A investment led by Fred Wilson from the venture capital firm Union Square Ventures. In December, the company received a US$25 million investment from the venture capital firm Andreessen Horowitz, Union Square Ventures (USV), and Ribbit Capital. Olaf Carlson-Wee, a graduate from Vassar College, was hired as the first employee in the same year.

In 2014, Coinbase grew to one million users, acquired the blockchain explorer service Blockr and the web bookmarking company Kippt, secured insurance covering the value of bitcoin stored on their servers and launched the vault system for secure bitcoin storage. Throughout 2014, the company also partnered with Overstock, Dell, Expedia, Dish Network, and Time Inc. allowing those firms to accept bitcoin payments. In the same year, the company also added bitcoin payment processing capabilities to the traditional payment companies Stripe, Braintree, and PayPal. In January 2014, Coinbase Global, Inc. was incorporated in Delaware as a holding company for Coinbase and its subsidiaries. The corporate reorganization that saw Coinbase become a subsidiary of Coinbase Global was completed in April of that year.

In January 2015, Coinbase received a US$75 million investment, led by Draper Fisher Jurvetson, the New York Stock Exchange, USAA, and several banks. Later in January, the company launched a U.S.-based bitcoin exchange for professional traders called Coinbase Exchange. In September, Coinbase began to offer services in Canada and Singapore.

In May 2016, Coinbase rebranded the Coinbase Exchange, changing the name to Global Digital Asset Exchange (GDAX). In July, they added retail support for Ether. Also, in July, they announced they would halt services in August after the closure of Canadian online payments service provider Vogogo.

In January and then March 2017, Coinbase obtained BitLicense and was licensed to trade in Ethereum and Litecoin from the New York State Department of Financial Services (DFS). In November, Coinbase was ordered by the U.S. Internal Revenue Service (IRS) to report any users who had at least US$20,000 in transactions in a year. On December 19, Coinbase listed Bitcoin Cash, and the Coinbase platform experienced price abnormalities that led to an insider trading investigation.

On February 23, 2018, Coinbase told approximately 13,000 affected customers that the company would be providing their taxpayer ID, name, birth date, address, and historical transaction records from 2013 to 2015 to the IRS within 21 days. In March, Coinbase appointed Emilie Choi, a former LinkedIn executive, as Vice President of Corporate and Business Development. She was promoted to the role of president and chief operating officer in May 2019. On March 26, 2018, Coinbase announced their intention to add support for Ethereum ERC-20 tokens. On April 5, 2018, Coinbase announced that it had formed an early-stage venture fund, Coinbase Ventures, focusing on investment into blockchain- and cryptocurrency-related companies. That month, Balaji Srinivasan, CEO of Earn.com, became Coinbase's first CTO when Coinbase purchased Earn.com, becoming Coinbase Earn. (He would leave one year later.) On May 16, Coinbase Ventures announced its first investment in Compound Labs, a start-up building Ethereum smart contracts similar to money markets. On May 23, GDAX was rebranded as Coinbase Pro. Also in May, Coinbase launched Prime, a platform dedicated to institutional customers. In August, Amazon cloud executive Tim Wagner joined Coinbase as vice president of engineering. In September, Coinbase, along with Circle and bitcoin miner company Bitmain, was part of a consortium called Centre that launched a digital coin called USD Coin, pegged to the U.S. dollar.

In January 2019, Coinbase stopped all trading on Ethereum Classic due to a suspicion of an attack on the network. In February, Coinbase announced that it had acquired "blockchain intelligence platform" Neutrino, an Italy-based startup, for an undisclosed price. The acquisition raised concern among some Coinbase users based on Neutrino founders' connection to the HackingTeam, which has been accused of providing internet surveillance technology to governments with poor human rights records. On March 4, Coinbase CEO Brian Armstrong said his company "did not properly evaluate" the deal from a due diligence perspective and thus any Neutrino staff who previously worked at Hacking Team "will transition out of Coinbase." In August, Coinbase announced that it was targeted by a hacking attack attempt in mid-June. This reported attack used spear-phishing and social engineering tactics (including sending fake e-mails from compromised email accounts and creating a landing page at the University of Cambridge) and two Firefox browser zero-day vulnerabilities. One of the Firefox vulnerabilities could allow an attacker to escalate privileges from JavaScript on a browser page (CVE-2019–11707) and the other, could allow the attacker to escape the browser sandbox and execute code on the host computer (CVE-2019–11708). Coinbase's security team detected and blocked the attack, the network was not compromised, and no cryptocurrency was stolen.

=== 2020–2021: remote-first working and IPO ===
In May 2020, during the COVID-19 pandemic, Coinbase announced it was shifting completely to remote work and would no longer recognize a formal headquarters. Also in May, the company announced the acquisition of New York-based digital asset trading firm Tagomi for a price between US$75 and US$100 million. In June, Coinbase received internal backlash after CEO Brian Armstrong initially refused to make a statement about Black Lives Matter, citing the company's apolitical culture, but Armstrong later reversed his course on Twitter. In September, Armstrong published a blog post emphasizing that Coinbase would not engage in social activism, citing that such activism had hurt other technology firms such as Google and Facebook, and offered a severance package for those who disagreed with this direction. The company also faced complaints by employees saying they were treated unfairly due to their race or gender.

In October, Coinbase announced the launch of a Visa debit card program. In December, The New York Times reported that based upon data up to 2018 (already two years old as of the date of publication) women at Coinbase were paid an average of eight percent less than men at comparable jobs and ranks within the company, and Black employees were paid seven percent less than those in similar roles. Aaron Renn, however, notes that this analysis "made no adjustments for education or experience levels."

In March 2021, Coinbase fell under review by the Office of Foreign Assets Control, with concerns that the company may have provided their blockchain service to blacklisted individuals or companies, noting that the nature of blockchain technology makes it "technically infeasible" to prevent specific users from making transactions. That same month, Coinbase announced that it was establishing a business presence in India and hiring employees for IT services, including engineering, software development and customer support operations. The company also announced plans to open a physical office in Hyderabad.

In April 2021, with its final earnings release before its April 14 direct listing, Coinbase reported a nine-fold increase in first-quarter revenue, to US$1.8 billion, up from US$90.6 million the previous year. The jump was attributed to the increase in the price of bitcoin over that period.

On April 14, 2021, Coinbase became a public company on the Nasdaq exchange via a direct stock listing. Before the listing, Nasdaq set a reference price of US$250 a share, giving the company an estimated value of US$47 billion. At the end of its first day of trading, Coinbase closed at US$328.28 per share. In May, the company's chief people officer published a blog post announcing that Coinbase was eliminating salary and equity negotiations during recruiting, citing salary disparities with women and minorities. The announcement said that "all employees in the same position, in the same location, receive the same salary and equity offer".

In June, Coinbase added Dogecoin to its tradable assets for Coinbase Pro users. In September, the U.S. Securities and Exchange Commission reportedly threatened to sue Coinbase if the company decided to launch a cryptocurrency lending product called Lend. The company initially responded in a blog post that it was confused for being singled out by the SEC, but later announced it had cancelled the planned launch. Technology publication TechCrunch covered the story and noted the existence of similar cryptocurrency lending products already on the market.

In November, Coinbase made its first acquisition in India by purchasing AI-powered support platform Agara for an estimated US$40 to US$50 million. The company stated that it would utilize Agara's technology to automate its customer experience tools. On December 15 a display glitch vastly inflated balances so that numerous users were incorrectly shown to be trillionaires.

=== 2022–2025: SEC lawsuit and dismissal; other updates ===
In February 2022, Coinbase's 60-second commercial during Super Bowl LVI involved a QR code to direct viewers to the company's webpage and was effective, according to Adweek. In the following month, in response to the 2022 Russian invasion of Ukraine, Coinbase blocked 25,000 cryptocurrency wallet addresses related to Russia.

Coinbase began operations in India in April 2022. The company initially relied on Unified Payments Interface to allow users to convert rupees to cryptocurrencies, but ceased using UPI after a statement released by the National Payments Corporation of India indicating it was "not aware of any crypto exchange using UPI". This statement forced Coinbase to suspend most of its business in India. Users in India cannot convert rupees into cryptocurrency but can trade between different cryptocurrencies.

In May 2022, Coinbase-backed Mara raised US$23 million to build an African crypto Exchange. On June 14, 2022, the company announced it would be laying off approximately 18% of its workforce, about 1,100 full-time jobs, amid the global downturn in cryptocurrencies and services. In August 2022, Coinbase announced a partnership with BlackRock, a venture which allows BlackRock clients to use their Aladdin investment management system to oversee their exposure to bitcoin along with other portfolio assets, and to facilitate trading on Coinbase's exchange.

In October 2022, Coinbase entered into a partnership with Google Cloud Platform that would allow the latter's customers to pay for cloud services with cryptocurrencies supported by Coinbase Commerce. Coinbase also agreed to transfer its data-related applications from Amazon Web Services to Google Cloud.

On January 10, 2023, Coinbase announced it would be laying off around 950 employees, incurring restructuring expenses of up to US$163 million. Citing the possibility of "further contagion" following the collapse of the FTX exchange, Brian Armstrong said Coinbase would be "shutting down several projects where we have a lower probability of success".

In February 2023, Coinbase launched its own layer 2 blockchain on Ethereum, based on MIT-licensed OP Stack of layer-2 blockchain Optimism. In April 2023, the company announced that its Coinbase Bermuda division had been licensed to operate cryptocurrencies in Bermuda. The next month, the company launched the Bermuda-based crypto derivatives exchange, named Coinbase International Exchange, allowing non-U.S. customers to trade bitcoin and Ethereum futures. In July 2023, Coinbase was reported to have leased 40,000 sq.ft. of office space in Mountain View, California within the Bay Area. This followed the company's prior closing of its San Francisco headquarters amid its transformation to become a remote-first and headquarterless company.

In December 2024, Coinbase added Apple Pay support to its Onramp platform (formerly known as Coinbase Pay), allowing users of third-party apps to fund their crypto purchases directly through Apple's payment service. The supported cryptocurrencies included bitcoin, ether, Dogecoin and others present on the crypto exchange.

==== SEC lawsuit and dismissal ====
On 22 March 2023, Coinbase received a Wells notice from the U.S. Securities and Exchange Commission (SEC) signalling that the SEC intended to begin an enforcement action over Coinbase's staking products. Coinbase responded by calling the investigation "cursory", and stated that it would continue to operate as usual. The next month, Coinbase sued the SEC asking a federal court to force the regulator to respond to a rulemaking petition the company submitted last year asking it to make clear regulations pertaining cryptocurrencies. In June 2023, the SEC said it was suing Coinbase, alleging that the company had been acting as an unregistered broker, exchange and clearing agency since 2019, requesting that the company be "permanently restrained and enjoined" from doing so. The SEC also alleged that Coinbase never registered its staking service as required by U.S. securities laws.

In February 2025 following the election of Donald Trump, the SEC dismissed its lawsuit against Coinbase, putting an end to a legal battle between the two.

=== 2025–present: recent history ===
In March 2025, Coinbase said it was the largest node operator on the Ethereum network, controlling 11.42% of all staked Ether (ETH).

In May 2025, Coinbase disclosed an extortion attempt where cybercriminals bribed rogue overseas support agents to steal customer data for social engineering attacks. The stolen data included personal and account information, but no passwords, private keys, or funds. Coinbase refused to pay the $20 million ransom that was asked and instead offered a $20 million reward for information leading to the attackers' conviction. The company said "less than 1 per cent" of its data was impacted. On May 15, 2025, Coinbase announced it expected the attack would cost the company up to $400 million. Wired reported that Coinbase would reimburse customers up to $400 million.

On May 8, 2025, Coinbase announced the acquisition of Deribit, a Dubai-based cryptocurrency derivatives exchange, for $700 million in cash and $2.2 billion worth of Coinbase stock. Coinbase was included in the S&P 500 index on May 19, 2025.

In June 2025, Coinbase initiated establishing an office in Charlotte for its compliance and customer support teams. The company also maintained offices in San Francisco and New York, and employed nearly 4,000 people with roughly 95% working remotely.

In October 2025, eight months after the SEC lawsuit was dismissed under the Trump administration, Coinbase was one of the donors who funded the White House's East Wing demolition and planned building of a ballroom. That same month, the company reported it was holding digital assets worth $516 billion on its platform.

In May 2026, Coinbase announced it was laying off 14% of its staff, with non-technical teams now shipping production code. This strategy was widely criticized by its users and press for its unorthodox nature.

== Products ==
As of 2025, Coinbase operates the largest U.S. based cryptocurrency exchange with over 108 million customers. It offers products for retail and institutional cryptocurrency investors, and other users including merchants and small businesses.

=== Retail Trading Products ===
- Coinbase, an app used to buy, store and trade different cryptocurrencies
- Coinbase One, a feed-based plan for premium features and services
- Coinbase Advanced (formerly Coinbase Pro), a professional asset trading platform for trading digital assets
- Coinbase Wallet, an app that allows customers to access decentralized crypto applications (dapps) using a dapp browser
- USD Coin, a digital stablecoin, issued by Circle Internet Financial in which Coinbase holds an equity stake
- Coinbase Card, a debit Visa card that allows customers to spend cryptocurrency
- Coinbase Earn, a staking service in which cryptocurrency holders volunteer to take part in validating transactions on the blockchain. The process involves users staking, or locking, their crypto on the blockchain and earning interest (staking rewards) from the network.

=== Business and Institutional Products ===
- Coinbase Business, a “crypto operating account” for small businesses which allows accepting customer payments in crypto currencies, paying vendors, employees and partners, and trading and managing crypto currencies. It also provides streamlined accounting reconciliation into platforms like QuickBooks and Xero.
- Coinbase Commerce, a payment service that allows merchants to accept cryptocurrency in their stores, with features including payment buttons, hosted checkout pages and invoices
- Coinbase Custody, which holds bitcoin and other cryptocurrencies on behalf of institutional clients in secure "cold storage accounts" not connected to the Internet
- Coinbase Payments, a stablecoin payments service for e-commerce. Features include a "connectivity layer" to assist merchants and payment service providers in authorizing transactions, handling refunds and managing subscriptions, a "payments protocol" which helps merchants execute transactions on the blockchain, and a "checkout suite" to help consumers pay from Coinbase Wallets.
- Coinbase Prime, a trading platform for institutional clients

Additionally, Coinbase provides Coinbase Developer Platform for developers and non-technical users, which facilitates "on-chain" actions like balance checks, ETH testnet requests, and asset transfers. These functionalities allow the users to experiment with autonomous blockchain operations, aiming to improve the experience while executing smart contract transactions and other decentralized actions. The company also provides an application programming interface (API) for developers and merchants to build applications and accept payments in digital currencies.

Although cryptocurrencies can assure anonymous trade in principle, Coinbase trades are not anonymous. Registered users are required to provide their taxpayer identification, and the transactions are reported to the IRS. Also, even though Coinbase offers more than 250 different cryptocurrencies to U.S. customers as of 2023, it does not trade Monero and other cryptocurrencies with enhanced anonymity protection due to the know your customer (KYC) requirements in accordance with anti–money laundering regulations.

== Operations and financials ==
From 2021 to 2025, Coinbase operated as a remote-first company and has no physical headquarters. In 2025, Coinbase leased a large office space in San Francisco to serve as a physical headquarters and operations hub. The company also announced a large office opening in Charlotte, North Carolina to serve as its "Center of Excellence."

In April 2019, a U.K. corporate filing stated that Coinbase's non-U.S. revenue grew 20 percent to €153 million (US$173 million) in 2018 resulting in a net profit of €6.6 million. Coinbase U.K. CEO Zeeshan Feroz said the company's non-U.S. operations accounted for nearly one-third of the company's overall revenue and Reuters estimated that the company's global revenue totalled "around US$520 million" in 2018.

In 2021, as part of its SEC filing to go public, Coinbase reported 43 million verified users, 7,000 institutions, and 115,000 ecosystem partners in over 100 countries. It also reported net revenue of US$1.14 billion in 2020, up from US$483 million the previous year. The company also reported a net income of US$322 million after posting a loss in 2019. Out of the US$782 billion worth of assets on the crypto market, some US$90 billion worth were held on the Coinbase platform.

In a May 2022 Form 10-Q filing, Coinbase stated that "because custodially held crypto assets may be considered to be the property of a bankruptcy estate, in the event of a bankruptcy, the crypto assets we hold in custody on behalf of our customers could be subject to bankruptcy proceedings and such customers could be treated as our general unsecured creditors". The company reported a net loss of US$1.1 billion in the second quarter of 2022, a record for Coinbase.

As of 2025, Coinbase is the world's largest custodian of bitcoin, holding over 12% of all bitcoin in existence. It also holds over 11% of all staked Ether and other digital assets like solana. In its 2024 annual report, the company said it was managing digital assets worth US$404 billion on its platform.

Information from Coinbase's Form 10-K annual reports
Year	Revenue in bil. US$	Net income in bil. US$	Assets in bil. US$	Total equity in bil. US$	Employees
2019	0.534	-0.030	17	1.062	750
2020	1.14	0.322	90	1.526	1,249
2021	7.839	3.624	278	6.382	3,730
2022	3.193	−2.625	75	5.455	4,510
2023	3.109	0.095	191	6.282	3,416
2024	6.565	2.578	404	10.28	3,772

== Political activity ==
Coinbase contributed $49 million to pro-cryptocurrency super PAC Fairshake in 2024. As of August 2026, Coinbase spent $57.1 million in political contributions in the 2026 United States elections, including $52.4 million donated to Fairshake.

== Legal compliance ==
Coinbase has been described as a conservative and law-abiding cryptocurrency exchange, in comparison to its peers in the sector.

As of 2025, Coinbase maintains an "A+" rating by the Better Business Bureau. Earlier, from 2018 to 2023, the company received an "F" rating from the bureau due to poor customer service. Common customer complaints included being locked out of their accounts despite providing the required information for reinstatement, as well as finding it "nearly impossible" to reach support when assistance was needed.

=== Customer complaints (2018—2021) ===
On February 16, 2018, Coinbase admitted that some customers were overcharged in error for credit and debit purchases of cryptocurrencies. The problem was initiated when banks and card issuers changed the merchant category code (MCC) for cryptocurrency purchases earlier that month. This meant that cryptocurrency payments would now be processed as "cash advances", meaning that banks and credit card issuers could begin charging customers cash advance fees for cryptocurrency purchases. Customers who purchased cryptocurrency on their exchange between January 22 and February 11, 2018, could have been affected. At first, Visa blamed Coinbase, telling the Financial Times on February 16 that it had "not made any systems changes that would result in the duplicate transactions cardholders are reporting". However, the latest statement from Visa and Worldpay on the Coinbase blog clarifies: "This issue was not caused by Coinbase".

In March 2018, the Quartz news Web site reported that the number of monthly customer complaints against Coinbase jumped more than 100 percent in January of that year, to 889, citing official Consumer Financial Protection Bureau data, with more than 400 of those categorized as "money was not available when promised". The article also noted that the company was subsequently increasing its customer service staff to reduce wait times.

In March 2021, Coinbase agreed to pay US$6.5 million to settle regulatory claims that it had reported misleading information about its trading volumes. In December 2021, CNBC reported that Coinbase froze the cryptocurrency GYEN due to a sudden price spike, resulting in many traders losing money.

=== Insider trading complaint (2022) ===
On July 22, 2022, a former Coinbase product manager, Ishan Wahi, along with Nikhil Wahi (Ishan's brother) and Sameer Ramani (a friend), was charged in the first-ever insider trading case in cryptocurrency by prosecutors for the Southern District of New York and the Securities and Exchange Commission. According to the complaint filed in SEC v. Wahi, Ishan Wahi allegedly shared information that certain tokens were about to be listed by Coinbase with Nikhil Wahi and Ramani, who then allegedly acted upon that information to make trades for an alleged illicit profit over US$1.5 million. According to federal prosecutors, Ishan Wahi purchased a one-way ticket to India upon being summoned by Coinbase to the company's Seattle office for a meeting. Wahi was subsequently intercepted by law enforcement from boarding a May 16 flight to India. Coinbase's chief security officer, Philip Martin, noted that the company provided prosecutors with information from an internal investigation.

On January 10, 2023, Nikhil Wahi was sentenced to ten months in prison after he admitted to making trades based on confidential information from Coinbase. U.S. District Judge Loretta Preska said Wahi's crime was "not an isolated error in judgment". Ishan Wahi originally pleaded not guilty but entered a guilty plea on February 7, 2023. On May 9, 2023, Ishan Wahi was sentenced to two years in prison and ordered to forfeit various crypto assets that he received in connection with the scheme. Ramani remains at large.

=== Regulator concerns (2023—2024) ===
In January 2023, Coinbase agreed to pay a US$50 million penalty to the New York State Department of Financial Services (NYDFS) over allegations that the cryptocurrency exchange broke anti-money laundering laws. The company was also required to invest an additional US$50 million in its compliance program to help prevent future violations. According to the NYDFS, Coinbase was unable to keep up with the number of alerts from its transaction monitoring system, a tool that was supposed to detect suspicious activity on the trading platform. Coinbase allegedly amassed a backlog of over 100,000 alerts, resulting in the company failing to report and investigate suspicious transactions in a timely manner. That same month, the Dutch Central Bank (DNB) fined Coinbase €3.3 million for failing to obtain the correct registration in the Netherlands before offering services. Coinbase said in response that it disagreed with the DNB's decision, which it said "includes no criticism of our actual services" and was considering an appeal.

In July 2024, Coinbase's U.K. branch was fined £3.5 million by the British regulator Financial Conduct Authority (FCA) after the former's breach of the voluntary agreement brokered between the two in October 2020. According to the voluntary agreement, Coinbase had agreed to not accept new users that the regulator considered high-risk. The FCA said that breaches of the agreement increased the risk that criminals could use Coinbase to launder the proceeds of crime. Coinbase stated in response that it had unintentionally onboarded a number of customers between October 2020 and October 2023 who were classified as high-risk and that those customers represented 0.34% of all customers on-boarded.

== See also ==
- List of bitcoin companies
- List of cryptocurrency trading platforms
