= Pantera Capital =

U.S. hedge fund

- Trade name: Pantera Advisors, LLC
- Type: Private
- Founded: 2003; 23 years ago
- Founder: Dan Morehead
- Headquarters: Menlo Park, California, U.S.
- Area served: United States; Puerto Rico
- Key people: Paul Veradittakit (Managing Partner); Franklin Bi (General Partner); Cosmo Jiang (General Partner)
- Products: Alternative Investments; Digital Assets
- AUM: US$5 billion (2025)
- Website: Official website

Pantera Capital is an American venture capital and hedge fund firm focused on digital assets headquartered in San Francisco, California. The fund specializes in cryptocurrencies and blockchain technology. It is one of the largest digital asset funds in the world by managed assets.

== History ==
The firm was founded in San Francisco, California in 2003 by Dan Morehead, before opening offices on Silicon Valley's Sand Hill Road. Morehead was previously the Head of Global Macro Trading and CFO at Tiger Management and is seen as one of the fund's "tiger cubs."

== Funding ==
In 2013, Pantera launched the first institutional investment fund focused on Bitcoin in the United States. It was started with $13 million. By December 2017, the fund was up 25,004%, with compound annual returns around 250 percent since its inception. The fund opened an office in New York during the early 2000s and established operations in Puerto Rico in 2021.

Pantera launched its second and third venture funds in 2014 and 2018, respectively. Venture Fund II raised $25 million while Venture Fund III raised $175 million.

== See also ==
- List of Tiger Cubs
- Economics of bitcoin
- Cryptocurrency exchange
