= List of microcredit lending websites =

This is an incomplete list of microcredit lending social websites:

- Kiva (organization)
- United Prosperity (organisation)
- Wokai
- Energy in Common
- World Vision
- MicroPlace
- Zidisha
