= Jane Shaw Carpenter =

English scientist and business executive

- Education: University of Birmingham
- Employers: Alza; Worcester Foundation for Biomedical Research
- Spouse: Peter F. Carpenter

Jane Elizabeth Shaw Carpenter is a British-born American scientist, pharmaceutical executive, inventor, corporate director, and philanthropist. She is best known for co-inventing the transdermal scopolamine patch for the prevention of motion sickness and for her leadership roles at ALZA Corporation, Aerogen, and Intel Corporation. From 2009 to 2012, she served as Chair of the Board of Intel, becoming the first woman to hold that position. Her work in controlled drug delivery contributed to the development of several transdermal therapeutic systems, including patches for scopolamine, nitroglycerin, and estrogen. She holds multiple patents in pharmaceutical drug delivery and has served on the boards of several Fortune 500 companies and nonprofit organizations.

== Early life and education ==
Shaw Carpenter grew up in the village of Upton Warren, Worcestershire, England. She attended the local village school before continuing her education in Worcester. After spending a year working in a hospital, she enrolled at the University of Birmingham, where she earned a Bachelor of Science degree in Physiology in 1961 and a doctorate in Physiology in 1963. Her doctoral research on transdermal drug absorption later formed the scientific foundation for her work in controlled drug delivery systems.

== Scientific career ==
=== Early research ===
In 1964, Shaw accepted a two-year post doctoral research position at the Worcester Foundation for Experimental Biology in Shrewsbury, Massachusetts, which was extended to six years. In 1970, the Worcester team was recruited by Alejandro Zaffaroni to join Alza in Palo Alto, California. Zaffaroni started the pharmaceutical company in 1968 to investigate methods for controlled drug delivery systems.

=== ALZA Corporation ===
At Alza, Shaw became a product leader and co-inventor of the scopolamine transdermal patch to treat motion sickness. The first patent for the product was filed in 1977, with credit to John Urquhart, Kumar Chandrasekaran and Jane Shaw. Her team also developed transdermal patches for the delivery of nitroglycerin for angina and estrogen, used in hormonal replacement therapy. Shaw holds at least seven patents as a result of her research work.

Her research group subsequently developed additional transdermal delivery systems for nitroglycerin, used in the treatment of angina, and estrogen replacement therapy. Collectively, these technologies helped establish transdermal drug delivery as a major pharmaceutical platform.

=== Executive leadership ===
After establishing herself as a research scientist, Shaw Carpenter moved into executive management at ALZA. She served successively as Vice President of Product Research and Development, Executive Vice President, Chairman of ALZA UK, and ultimately President and Chief Operating Officer between 1987 and 1994.

Her tenure reflected the transition of ALZA from an innovative biotechnology company into one of the world's leading developers of controlled drug-delivery systems.

=== Aerogen ===
In 1998, Shaw Carpenter joined Aerogen, which developed controlled delivery systems for deploying drugs to the lungs. She helped to develop pulmonary drug delivery systems including inhaled insulin for diabetic patients and antibiotics for lung infections. She served as Aerogen's Chairman and CEO through 2005, and later became U.S. chair of its Scientific Advisory Board.

=== Corporate governance ===
Shaw Carpenter served on the Board of Directors of Intel Corporation from 1993–2012. She was personally invited to join the board by Gordon Moore. From 2009–2012, she was Chairman of the Board of Intel, the first woman to hold that position.

Shaw Carpenter also served on the Board of Directors of OfficeMax Inc. (1994–2006), Talima (2007–2011), McKesson (1992–2014) and Yahoo (2014–2017).

=== Philanthropy ===
Throughout her career, Shaw Carpenter has combined scientific leadership with sustained involvement in philanthropy and nonprofit governance. Together with her husband, Peter F. Carpenter, she has supported initiatives in healthcare, education, scientific research, international development, and community service. Their philanthropic work has emphasized innovative, community-based programs with measurable social impact rather than large institutional grant-making.

Shaw Carpenter has served on the boards of several nonprofit organizations, including the Lucile Packard Children's Hospital at Stanford, where she contributed to institutional governance and pediatric healthcare initiatives. She has also served as a trustee and chair of Grace Cathedral in San Francisco and as a member of the board of the Oregon Shakespeare Festival, reflecting her long-standing support for healthcare, education, and the arts.

Much of the Carpenters' philanthropic activity has been conducted through the Philanthropic Ventures Foundation, where they established a donor-advised fund supporting educational and health projects in the United States and internationally. Their charitable initiatives have included support for the Silver Fork School in Pollock Pines, California, providing resources for science education, arts programs, musical instruction, field trips, and summer learning opportunities for students in a rural two-room schoolhouse.

Internationally, the Carpenters have supported educational initiatives in Tanzania and Bhutan. Through the Philanthropic Ventures Foundation's Generosity in Action program, they helped fund the establishment of a model secondary school for girls in Tanzania, intended to expand educational opportunities and leadership development for young women. They have also supported educational infrastructure and community development projects in Bhutan, including assistance to schools serving rural communities.

In recognition of their combined contributions to science, public service, and philanthropy, Jane Shaw Carpenter and Peter F. Carpenter received the Avenidas Lifetimes of Achievement Award in 2023. The award recognized their decades of leadership in pharmaceutical innovation, nonprofit governance, education, and charitable service.

== Scientific legacy ==
Carpenter is recognized for her contributions to controlled drug-delivery systems, particularly transdermal therapeutic technology. At ALZA Corporation, she was involved in the development of transdermal systems that enabled controlled and sustained administration of drugs through the skin. She was a co-inventor of the transdermal scopolamine patch, introduced in the late 1970s for the prevention of motion sickness and among the first commercially successful modern transdermal therapeutic systems.

Carpenter and her colleagues subsequently developed transdermal systems for drugs including nitroglycerin and estrogen, helping expand the clinical applications of patch-based drug delivery. Her research and patents addressed the physiological, pharmacokinetic, and engineering principles underlying controlled release through the skin, contributing to the development of transdermal delivery as an established pharmaceutical technology.

Her career also extended into biotechnology management. She held executive positions at ALZA and later served as chairman and chief executive officer of Aerogen, where she oversaw the development of pulmonary drug-delivery technologies. She subsequently held corporate leadership and board positions in the technology, healthcare, and biotechnology sectors, including serving as chair of Intel Corporation from 2009 to 2012.

== Personal life ==
Shaw Carpenter is married to Peter Fredrick Carpenter, with whom she shares one son, Jonathan.

== Awards and honors ==
- 1990, Fellow, American Association of Pharmaceutical Scientists
- 1993, Athena Award, Mountain View Chamber of Commerce
- 1994, Founders Award, Alza Corporation
- 2002, Entrepreneurial Achievement Award, Forum for Women Entrepreneurs
- 2009, Outstanding Woman of Silicon Valley
- 2010, ODX Outstanding Director Award, Outstanding Directors Exchange
- 2013, Outstanding Director Award, Lucile Packard Children's Hospital at Stanford (LPCH)
- 2016, Bay Area Business Hall of Fame, Bay Area Council
- 2023, Avenidas Lifetimes of Achievement award.
