= Premal Shah =

Indian-American entrepreneur

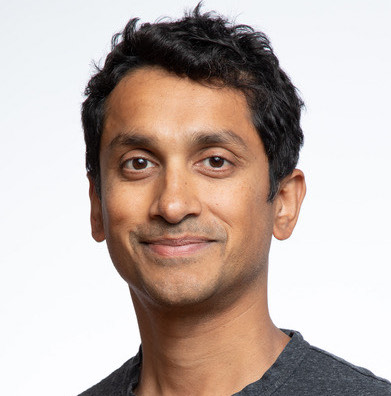
- Born: 1975 (age 50–51); Ahmedabad, Gujarat, India
- Education: Stanford University
- Occupation: Co-founder Kiva
- Board member of: Center for Humane Technology, Change.org Foundation, Watsi.org, VolunteerMatch
- Website: Kiva.org

Premal Shah (born 1975) is an Indian-American entrepreneur who co-founded Kiva, a global poverty alleviation non-profit that has raised over $2 billion for low-income entrepreneurs in eighty countries.

== Early life ==
Shah was born in Ahmedabad, India, and raised in Minnesota, graduating from Irondale High School. He attended Stanford University, where he pursued his interest in economic development, with a specific focus on microfinance. At the London School of Economics he received a research grant to study the microfinance work of the Self-Employed Women's Association.

== Career ==
Shah was an early employee of and principal product manager at PayPal. Building on his college interest in microfinance, Shah took a sabbatical from PayPal in 2004 to prototype a concept of person-to-person microlending in India.

Upon his return to Silicon Valley in 2005, Shah joined Matt Flannery and Jessica Jackley in launching Kiva and scaling it into a global organization. Kiva has since raised over two billion dollars in loans from over two million lenders in support of over five million entrepreneurs from 62 countries, with a 96% repayment rate. 81% of loans are disbursed to women, and 67% of loan recipients live in rural communities.

In addition to serving as president of Kiva, Shah sits on the boards of other non-profit of organizations, including Center for Humane Technology, Change.org Foundation, Watsi, and VolunteerMatch. He is considered to be a part of the PayPal Mafia, a group of PayPal alumni who have gone on to found or co-found other successful companies, including YouTube, LinkedIn, Tesla Motors, and Yelp.

Premal is currently listed as a co-founder at renewables.org - an investment platform for renewable energy in emerging markets.

== Awards and honors ==
- Fortune Magazine's 40 Under 40 List.
- Obama White House Champion of Change
- Visionary of the Year Nominee, San Francisco Chronicle
- World Economic Forum - Young Global Leader selection
- Olympic Torch carrier for the 2008 Summer Games
- Skoll Award for Social Entrepreneurship
- Goldman Sachs 100 Most Intriguing Entrepreneurs
- In 2024 became an honoree of the Great Immigrants Award; the award was given by the Carnegie Corporation of New York.

== Personal life ==
Premal lives in San Francisco, California, with his wife and two children. He speaks widely about the potential for markets, technology & altruism to address some of society's toughest challenges.
