= Peter F. Carpenter =

American philanthropist and former business executive

- Born: 1940 (age 85–86); San Francisco, CA
- Education: Harvard University (1962); University of Chicago (1965)
- Occupations: Business executive Philanthropist
- Partner: Jane Shaw Carpenter
- Children: 1

Peter Fredrick Carpenter (born 1940) is an American philanthropist and former business executive. Carpenter served in a volunteer fire department during high school, and as a smokejumper for the United States Forest Service while at Harvard University. He graduated from Harvard (1962) and the University of Chicago (1965), serving as an officer in the United States Air Force from 1962-1968. Over the next decade, Carpenter worked for various employers, including Lockheed, Stanford University, and the US Price Commission.

In 1976 Carpenter began to work for the ALZA Corporation, a pharmaceutical company. At ALZA, Carpenter introduced a patient consent insert for the Progestasert intrauterine device (IUD) which was considered “revolutionary" in terms of patient education and drug labeling. In 1990, Carpenter stepped down from the position of executive vice president of ALZA to work in nonprofit leadership. He has served on the board of nonprofits including the American Foundation for AIDS Research (1985–1991), Annual Reviews (1994–present), and Village Enterprise Fund (1997–2009). From 2001 to 2018, he served several terms on the board of the Menlo Park Fire District. He and his wife Jane Shaw Carpenter are co-recipients of the Avenidas Lifetimes of Achievement award.

== Early life and education ==
Carpenter was born in 1940 in San Francisco, California, and spent part of his youth in Jacksonville, Florida, where he developed early interests in civic service and emergency response. During high school he served as a volunteer firefighter and became deeply involved in the Boy Scouts of America, earning the rank of Eagle Scout in 1955, an accomplishment he later cited as foundational to his lifelong emphasis on service, discipline, and institutional responsibility.

He attended Harvard University, graduating in 1962 with an AB in Chemistry. During his undergraduate years he participated in Reserve Officers’ Training Corps activities and worked as a smokejumper with the United States Forest Service in Northern California during summer breaks, gaining experience in airborne emergency operations and wilderness fire suppression.

Following Harvard, Carpenter entered the United States Air Force and completed graduate business studies at University of Chicago, earning an MBA in 1965 under Air Force sponsorship. He later pursued doctoral studies in organizational behavior at Stanford University between 1968 and 1970, though he did not complete the degree.

=== Military and federal service ===
Carpenter served as an officer in the United States Air Force from 1962 to 1968, receiving the Legion of Merit for distinguished service. His military assignments included advanced research and strategic systems management connected to the Defense Department’s emerging technological infrastructure during the Vietnam War era.

He worked as a program manager for Southeast Asia for the Advanced Research Projects Agency, later known as DARPA, where he was involved in systems development and communications coordination tied to military technology programs. He also served as an Air Force aide to the White House and held operational assignments involving airborne deployment and reconnaissance support.

His qualifications included designation as a Master Parachutist in the Air Force and parachutist certification through the United States Marine Corps.

== Career ==
=== Early professional career ===
After military service, He served as deputy executive director of the U.S. Price Commission during the Nixon administration, where he investigated inflationary pricing behavior and industrial compliance issues during federal economic stabilization efforts. This experience exposed him to national-scale regulatory analysis and public-sector institutional oversight.

Carpenter entered Stanford University’s research and administrative system, serving as assistant director of Stanford’s Center for Materials Research and later as executive-level administrator in Stanford medical affairs. He worked as assistant vice president for medical affairs and subsequently as executive director of Stanford University Medical Center.

=== ALZA Corporation (1976–1992) ===
In 1976 Carpenter joined ALZA Corporation, then one of Silicon Valley’s pioneering biomedical and drug-delivery companies. Over the next sixteen years he rose steadily through executive leadership, serving as vice president, vice president of corporate strategy, executive vice president, chairman of the strategic planning committee, and president of ALZA Development Corporation.

At ALZA he helped shape long-term corporate strategy during a period of rapid innovation in transdermal drug-delivery systems and pharmaceutical-device commercialization. He also played a notable role in advancing ethical patient-information practices. Under his leadership ALZA introduced one of the pharmaceutical industry’s earliest formal informed-consent documentation systems for marketed medical products, particularly for the company’s Progestasert intrauterine device.

Carpenter was also named inventor or co-inventor on several patents, including U.S. patents 4,318,400; 4,386,929; and 4,692,144, related to biomedical delivery technologies and pharmaceutical systems design.

He retired from active ALZA executive service in 1990 but remained as adviser on mission and values through 1992.

=== American Foundation for AIDS Research (AmFAR) ===
From 1985 to 1991, Carpenter served in multiple leadership roles at the American Foundation for AIDS Research (AmFAR). He was a member of the Board of Directors during this period and held senior governance responsibilities, including serving as Chairman of the Board of Directors and Chairman of the Executive Committee from 1987 to 1988. In addition to his board leadership, he was also a member of AmFAR’s Public Policy Committee from 1988 to 1991, where he contributed to the organization’s policy and advocacy efforts during a critical period of the HIV/AIDS crisis in the United States.

=== Mission and Values Institute ===
In 1991 Carpenter founded the Mission and Values Institute, reflecting his belief that organizations perform most effectively when strategic purpose is integrated with ethical culture and explicit institutional values.

Through the institute he advised corporations including CIBA-Geigy, Glaxo, and Affymax on organizational culture, mission alignment, ethical leadership structures, and strategic governance.

His work contributed to broader academic and managerial discussion around mission-based strategic management and the relationship between institutional purpose and organizational effectiveness. Carpenter became a recognized advocate for integrating ethics into strategic planning long before corporate ESG frameworks became mainstream.

=== Annual Reviews and scholarly publishing ===
Carpenter joined the board of Annual Reviews in 1994 and remained involved through 2025. He served as chair of the Ethics and Standards Committee, chaired the Business Advisory Committee, and later became president of Annual Reviews Investment Corporation.

=== Other works ===
Carpenter served in academic and health-policy roles. At Stanford he was a visiting scholar at the Center for Biomedical Ethics, served on Stanford Hospital review committees, advised Stanford in Government, and chaired the Haas Center for Public Service National Advisory Board.

He held governance roles at Alliant International University and chaired the board of United States International University Africa.

He also advised public-health initiatives through the University of California, Berkeley School of Public Health and served on Institute of Medicine committees focused on biomedical innovation, contraceptive research, addiction treatment research, and health policy evaluation.

Locally, he served on the Palo Alto Planning Commission and the San Mateo County Civil Grand Jury, and was appointed to the Palo Alto Emergency Services Council. Separately, he was elected to the board of the Menlo Park Fire Protection District, later serving as its board president.

In 2001, Carpenter was selected to fill a vacancy on the district board of the Menlo Park Fire District. He was elected to the board three times and appointed once more, becoming the longest-serving board member in the history of the fire district. He stepped down from the board in 2018 after not running for reelection.

He sat on the board of directors of the Village Enterprise Fund from 1997 to 2009. In 2006, he became director of the humanitarian organization InSTEDD (Innovative Support to Emergencies, Diseases and Disasters). With his wife Jane Shaw, Carpenter supports educational initiatives in California, Tanzania, and Bhutan via the Philanthropic Ventures Foundation (PVF).

== Philanthropy ==
His philanthropic work has centered on public health, global development, educational access, institutional ethics, emergency preparedness, biomedical policy, and nonprofit governance. Carpenter’s work has typically involved direct operational leadership through board service, institutional strategy, governance reform, and long-term organizational stewardship.

One of his earliest major nonprofit leadership roles was with amfAR, where he served as a director from 1985 to 1991 during a pivotal period in the global HIV/AIDS crisis. His tenure coincided with major national efforts to increase research funding, improve public-health policy responses, and reduce institutional stigma surrounding AIDS-related research and care. Carpenter’s participation reflected his broader interest in linking biomedical innovation with ethical public-health policy.

In 1991, following his retirement from active executive leadership at ALZA Corporation, Carpenter founded the Mission and Values Institute while serving as a Visiting Scholar at Stanford Center for Biomedical Ethics. The institute became one of his most influential philanthropic and intellectual projects, focusing on helping corporations, nonprofit institutions, and public organizations articulate mission-driven governance frameworks.

Carpenter has also played a major role in scientific and scholarly philanthropy through his decades of service with Annual Reviews. Since joining its board in 1994, he has served in numerous leadership capacities, including chairmanship of its Ethics and Standards Committee and Business Advisory Committee, as well as serving as president of Annual Reviews Investment Corporation.

Carpenter served on the board of Village Enterprise from 1997 to 2009, supporting entrepreneurial poverty-alleviation initiatives across East Africa through microenterprise development. He also served as a director of Project Baobab and the Bahati Foundation, both focused on health, educational opportunity, and institutional capacity-building in Tanzania. These efforts frequently intersected with long-term development initiatives supported jointly with his wife, Jane Shaw Carpenter.

Together, the Carpenters have provided philanthropic support for educational and leadership-development initiatives in Tanzania, Bhutan, and California through collaborations with Philanthropic Ventures Foundation.

Carpenter also served on the board of InSTEDD from 2006 to 2010, including terms as president and chairman. The organization develops open-source technological tools for disaster response, disease surveillance, humanitarian coordination, and public-health crisis management. His leadership there reflected his continuing interest in applying systems thinking and technological innovation to humanitarian problem-solving.

His public-health philanthropy extended to service on numerous advisory and governance bodies, including the Dean’s Policy Advisory Council at UC Berkeley School of Public Health, the board of the Alan Guttmacher Institute, and multiple committees of the National Academy of Medicine focused on contraceptive research, biomedical innovation, and addiction treatment development.

== Personal life ==
Peter Fredrick Carpenter is married to Jane Elizabeth Shaw Carpenter. Jane Shaw Carpenter is a former business executive at ALZA and a co-inventor of the scopolamine transdermal patch to treat motion sickness. They have one son, Jonathan Carpenter.

Peter Carpenter has been diagnosed with chronic lymphocytic leukemia (CLL). He has been granted benefits as a veteran by the United States Department of Veterans Affairs, in recognition that his cancer may have resulted from exposure to Agent Orange during his military service in Vietnam.

== Honors and recognition ==
Carpenter’s distinctions include the Legion of Merit, Harvard National Scholar recognition, and the John R. Hogness Lectureship. His aviation and operational qualifications include private pilot certification with instrument and glider ratings.

He has also been recognized with civic achievement honors for sustained public and philanthropic leadership in Northern California.
