= YND =

YND or ynd may refer to:

- YiNongDai, the largest online P2P lending platform in China
- YND, the IATA code for Gatineau-Ottawa Executive Airport, Quebec, Canada
- ynd, the ISO 639-3 code for Yandruwandha language, Australia
