= Richard Zulu =

Ugandan entrepreneur and founder of Outbox Uganda

- Born: Uganda
- Education: Namilyango College; Makerere University (BSc Information Technology, 2010)
- Occupations: Entrepreneur, Businessman, Technology leader
- Years active: 2010–present
- Known for: Founder and Managing Director of Outbox Uganda
- Title: Chairperson of Startup Uganda

Richard Zulu is a Ugandan entrepreneur, businessman and tech leader. He founded and directed 'Outbox Uganda', an established Innovation and Entrepreneur Support Organization.

== Early life and education ==
Zulu studies in Namilyango College. In 2012, Zulu graduated Makerere University with a Bachelor of Information Technology.

== Career ==
Zulu began his professional career in 2010 as a Network Administrator at Makerere University’s Directorate of ICT Support.

In 2011, while still at the Makerere University ICT department, Zulu co-organized Garage48 Kampala, a startup bootcamp and hackathon series, followed by Startup Weekend Kampala in 2012.

In 2012, Zulu founded Outbox Uganda, a technology innovation hub based in Kampala. Outbox Uganda supports startups by co-working space, mentorship, and business development support to entrepreneurs in Uganda.

In 2014, Zulu served as Community Manager for Amplify at IDEO.org, where he led design challenges to develop solutions for development problems. He also acted as the Google Developer Group (GDG) Kampala chapter lead and as Director of Startup Grind Kampala. He also worked as an Innovative Justice Agent with HiiL (The Hague Institute for Innovation of Law) and as an Open Government Fellow with Code for Africa, supporting civic technology and open data initiatives in 2016.

He joined Plan International as a Human-Centered Design Consultant for the Playful Futures programme in 2021. Currently, he is the Chairperson of Startup Uganda, another organization that brings together other entrepreneur support organizations in Uganda.

== See also ==
- Barbara Birungi
- Evelyn Namara
