= Energy in Common =

Organization

- Formation: 2009
- Dissolved: 2013
- Type: Nonprofit organization
- Purpose: Economic development
- Location: United States
- Region served: World-wide
- Method: Microcredit
- Key people: Scott Tudman (chief executive officer from 2011); Hugh Whalan (chief executive officer 2009-2011)
- Website: www.energyincommon.org

Energy in Common (EIC) was a not-for-profit organization issuing microloans specifically and only for renewable energy technologies. It operated between 2009 and 2013 when it suspended its lending activity due to a lack of funds.

What made EIC particularly unique in the microfinance non-profit sector was that they created a model to measure the greenhouse gas emission reductions that were created by their loans. The EIC model helped provide funding to developing world entrepreneurs for energy solutions and also helped to channel additional funding into mitigating climate change.

== History ==
=== Foundation ===
EIC was founded by Hugh Whalan and Scott Tudman in 2009 (website launch 2010). It has the goal of delivering renewable energy to 15 million people in the next five years, while fighting poverty by empowering developing world entrepreneurs through microloans.

EIC operated very similarly to Kiva. In the case of Kiva, lenders provide funds with zero return expected to developing world entrepreneurs to invest in their businesses (typical loans are for things like seeds for farming). EIC did this as well, but specifically focused on purchasing renewable energy systems like solar photovoltaic panels.

=== Change of CEO in 2011 ===
Hugh Whalan, who co-founded the organisation in 2009, left EIC in July 2011 to start a for-profit solar distribution and lending business in Ghana. Scott Tudman had been CEO since the organisation closed.

== Method of operation ==
- EIC enabled individuals to lend money to poor entrepreneurs in the developing world via website using a Kiva-like model that connected individual lenders and borrowers. Upon choosing a borrower the lender would decide how much to lend - either a fraction or the entire loan requested by the borrower. The minimum loan was set at $25 for the standard microloans and $5 for their innovative nanoloans (discussed below). The total of a given range was usually found between $40 and a thousand dollars. When enough individual lenders have provided the fractional loans to a borrower and the total amount required had been reached, the loan was dispersed by the EIC. All of the EIC loans were meant to directly alleviate poverty and mitigate greenhouse gas (GHG) emissions.
- EIC had partnered with several microfinance institutions (MFI)s. The MFIs provided EIC with lists of potential borrowers, which were screened by the EIC before any individual borrower was profiled. MFIs were responsible for disbursing the loan directly to the borrower and all maintenance and support services to the borrower after the energy product is purchased. To cover the expenses related to this responsibility, the MFIs received all of the interest charged to the customer for the loan. For their part, the EIC helped their MFIs partners with sourcing reliable energy technologies. EIC worked with four MFIs all based in Sub-Saharan Africa, but had plans to expand into other regions.
- When a loan was repaid, funds were deposited back into the lender's account and EIC calculated the individual project's Greenhouse gas (GHG) emission reductions. These GHG emission reductions could be used by a lender to offset their carbon emissions through a tax deductible donation to EIC. The total carbon emission offsets were determined for a project by subtracting the carbon emissions before and after the energy loan was provided.

== Technologies funded by EIC ==
The following list of primarily renewable energy technologies:

=== Biodigesters ===
Biodigesters convert organic wastes such as food waste, human waste and animal waste into nutrient rich liquid fertilizer and biogas (thus a renewable fuel made up primarily of methane). A biodigester is made up of a bag or tank that holds the organic 'wastes' over a period in which bacteria breaks down the organic matter and produces biogas. Biogas is used as a replacement for kerosene, firewood, or any other combustible fuel source used in the developing world such as cow dung. Biodegesters thus produce renewable energy, cut down on odors and pathogens in organic materials, reduce surface and groundwater contamination, improve indoor air quality and provide a source of high quality organic fertilizer as a byproduct—that has been shown to improve crop yields and decrease fertilizer costs.

=== Clean burning stoves ===
Clean burning stoves improve the fuel utilization over common stoves. There are several types but the ones funded often burn propane instead of less efficient fuels such as wood, charcoal, or dung. This is somewhat controversial as currently this allows for economic savings although clearly there is a potential to have negative effects of becoming dependent on a non-renewable energy source, which in many cases needs to be imported. Less controversial, is a clean burning stove that uses wood, charcoal, or dung, but burns more efficiently. These stoves funded by EIC are designed to increase the airflow to the fuel source, creating a better flame and reducing the amount of fuel required to provide a given amount of heat to the target (e.g. it takes less fuel wood to cook dinner). Both types of clean burning stoves reduce the costs associated with fuel use and improve the indoor air quality within the homes of the users.

=== Solar powered LED lighting ===
The LED lamps combine a small solar photovoltaic panel with a rechargeable battery and an array of LED lights into an effective lighting system, which is used to replace dangerous (indoor air quality, GHG emitting, and fire hazard) kerosene lamps. LED lights are known to be very efficient, which prolongs illumination time on the charging made available by the PV.

=== Solar photovoltaic home systems ===
A typical solar photovoltaic home system funded by EIC consists of a small solar panel (both pole or roof mounted) connected to a charge controller and a small battery. The stored solar electricity can be used both in the day and after dark to power lights and an electrical socket for other electrical equipment (e.g. cell phone charger, OLPC, radio, TV, or computer).

== Carbon offsets ==
EIC creates carbon offsets from emission reductions that have occurred over the loan term and only once the loan term has finished. In this way, lenders and those that make donations to retire carbon credits can be sure that all emission reductions have already happened. They do this by providing a detailed questionnaires before, during and after the loan, and in-depth field surveys conducted by both by EIC and independent auditing firms in order to sell the carbon offsets. The particularly clever part is that loaners may then buy the carbon credits and get a tax credit from EIC.

== Nanoloans ==
In order to overcome the initial investment barrier that many people had when considering microfinance, EIC developed the "Nanoloan" concept. For most microfinance institutions (e.g. Kiva) the minimum loan is $25 and the average time until repayment is about 18 months. This could put a lot of well-intentioned people off of the concept. EIC Nanoloans were a limited run of $5 loans, specifically designed to be repaid in just 60 days. The object of offering nanoloans was to introduce new lenders to the entire microlending process fast.

== See also ==
- Grameen Bank
- Kiva (organization)
- Microfinance
- Socially responsible investing
