= Stephen Stahl =

American psychiatrist

- Stahl in 2026
- Born: September 14, 1951 (age 75); Wauseon, Ohio
- Other names: Steve Stahl, Stephen Stahl, Stephen M. Stahl
- Education: Northwestern University (BS, MD); University of Chicago (PhD)
- Occupations: Psychiatrist, Neurologist
- Website: stevestahl.com

Stephen Michael Stahl is an American psychiatrist, psychopharmacologist, author, and academic. He is Distinguished Health Sciences Clinical Professor of Psychiatry and Neuroscience at the University of California, Riverside School of Medicine and has held academic and clinical appointments at institutions including Stanford University, the University of California, San Diego, and the University of California, Los Angeles. His work has focused on psychopharmacology, neuroscience, and the development and clinical use of treatments for psychiatric and neurological disorders. He is the author of numerous textbooks and scientific publications, including ''Stahl's Essential Psychopharmacology''.

== Education and early career ==
Stahl was born in Wauseon, Ohio and raised in Bryan, Ohio. In 1973, he completed his B.S. degree from Northwestern University and received his M.D. there in 1975. In 1976, he received his Ph.D. in Neuropharmacology from the University of Chicago. Later he trained in internal medicine at the University of Chicago, in neurology at the University of California, San Francisco, and in psychiatry at Stanford University. He is board certified in psychiatry. In 1981, he completed his residency in psychiatry at Stanford and became the assistant director of the Stanford Mental Health Clinical Research Center and assistant professor of psychiatry and behavioral Sciences at Stanford University Medical School where he worked until 1985.

== Career ==
=== Academic career ===
Stahl joined Stanford University in 1981 as an assistant professor of Psychiatry and Behavioural Sciences and taught there till 1985 when he became an adjunct associate professor of psychiatry and behavioural sciences and pharmacology at the University of California Los Angeles while working and living overseas in the UK where he taught at the Institute of Psychiatry, London as a Senior Lecturer and at the Institute of Neurology and the National Hospital for Nervous Diseases, London also as a Senior Lecturer. He served as an honorary consultant in psychiatry at the Maudsley Hospital, London from 1985 – 1988. In 1988, he joined University of California, San Diego as professor of psychiatry and chief of psychiatry at the San Diego Veterans Affairs Hospital. Currently he is an adjunct professor at the University of California San Diego.

In 2009, he was selected as an honorary senior visiting fellow by the University of Cambridge. He also directs psychopharmacology services and academic programs for the California Department of State Hospital System, where he also heads their assessment and treatment efforts to reduce violence.

At the University of California, Riverside, Stahl serves as Distinguished Health Sciences Clinical Professor of Psychiatry and Neuroscience. He is also an adjunct professor of psychiatry at the University of California, San Diego and has held an adjunct appointment at SUNY Upstate Medical University. At the University of Cambridge, he has been affiliated with the Department of Psychiatry and Clare Hall as an Honorary Visiting Senior Fellow.

Stahl has also contributed to postgraduate and continuing medical education in psychopharmacology. He has lectured internationally and developed educational programs based on neuroscience and psychiatric pharmacotherapy. In 2023, he delivered a Distinguished International Figure in Psychiatry Lecture honoring the first chair of psychiatry at the University of Cambridge.

=== Career in hospitals and pharmaceutical industry ===
In 1981, he became the director of Movement Disorders & Psychopharmacology Research Clinic at Veterans Affairs Medical Center in Palo Alto and chief of the Schizophrenia Biological Research Center and served there till 1985. Simultaneously, he also worked with the Alza Corporation as director of clinical sciences, associate medical director and principal scientist from 1982 to 1985 and then joined the Merck & Co. Research Laboratories and moved overseas to their Neuroscience Research Centre outside of London in 1985, where he stayed till 1988 as the director of the Laboratory of Clinical Neuropharmacology, head of a normal volunteer research unit, and executive director of research in Parkinson's Disease ultimately leading to the registration of Sinemet CR for this condition.

He has also been a scientific consultant and member of scientific advisory boards for dozens of Pharmaceutical companies, medical information companies, and public service organizations including the state Medicaid drug utilization committee of California over the past 35 years. He also serves as a member of the scientific advisory board for the psychiatric genomics company Genomind.

Stahl has subsequently worked in public-sector psychiatry in California. Since 2012, he has directed psychopharmacology services for the California Department of State Hospitals (DSH), providing clinical and educational leadership across the state hospital system. Current DSH materials continue to identify him as Director of DSH Psychopharmacology Services.

=== Neuroscience Education Institute ===
In 2000, Stahl founded the Neuroscience Education Institute (NEI), an organization providing continuing medical education in psychiatry and neurology. NEI developed educational programs based on psychopharmacology and neuroscience, including conferences, online courses, and multimedia educational materials. The organization was subsequently acquired by HMP Global in 2023.

=== Works ===
Stahl has written and edited extensively on psychopharmacology. His books include Stahl's Essential Psychopharmacology: Neuroscientific Basis and Practical Applications, first published by Cambridge University Press in 1996, and Stahl's Essential Psychopharmacology: Prescriber's Guide. The fifth edition of ''Stahl's Essential Psychopharmacology'' was published by Cambridge University Press in 2021.

Stahl's Essential Psychopharmacology presents psychiatric treatment through an integration of neurobiology, pharmacology, and clinical practice. The fifth edition covers subjects including psychosis and schizophrenia, mood disorders, anxiety and trauma, chronic pain, sleep disorders, attention deficit hyperactivity disorder, dementia, addiction, and related areas of psychopharmacology.

Stahl is author of over 500 articles and book chapters and more than 1600 scientific presentations and abstracts. He has written 35 text books and edited 12 others, including Stahl's Essential Psychopharmacology and Essential Psychopharmacology Prescriber's Guide. In 2015, he published the thriller novel Shell Shock.

Stahl's interests relate to producing and disseminating educational information about diseases and their treatments in psychiatry and neurology, with an emphasis on multimedia, the internet.

Stahl was consulted after revelations about inadequate mental health care in the US Army and at Fort Hood. His role was to train caregivers of wounded soldiers and ensure that the current system was appropriate.

Stahl has also authored or edited books and clinical guides on antidepressants, antipsychotics, mood stabilizers, anxiety disorders, attention deficit hyperactivity disorder, pain, substance use, violence, and other areas of psychiatric treatment. Bibliographic records list numerous titles published by Cambridge University Press and other academic publishers.

In addition to medical writing, Stahl has written the novel Shell Shock, a work of fiction concerning post-traumatic stress disorder, and a biography of Nikola Tesla examining the relationship between Tesla's life and possible bipolar disorder.

== Editorial works ==
Stahl has served as editor emeritus of 'CNS Spectrums and has held editorial positions with psychiatric and neuropsychopharmacology journals, including Acta Psychiatrica Scandinavica and the International Journal of Neuropsychopharmacology. He has also served on the editorial boards of journals in psychiatry and psychopharmacology.

He is a fellow of the American College of Neuropsychopharmacology, the British Association for Psychopharmacology, and the International College of Neuropsychopharmacology (CINP), where he has served as vice president. He is also a Distinguished Life Fellow of the American Psychiatric Association.

== Partial bibliography ==
- Essential Psychopharmacology. Cambridge University Press, New York, 1996. 2000. 2008. 2013. 2021.
- Psychopharmacology of Antidepressants. Martin Dunitz Press, London and Mosby, New York, 1997.
- Psychopharmacology of Antipsychotics. Martin Dunitz Press, London, 1999.
- Essential Psychopharmacology of Depression and Bipolar Disorder. Cambridge University Press, New York, New York, 2000.
- Illustrated Insights – Sleep: Excessive Sleepiness. NEI Press, Carlsbad, CA 2005.
- Essential Psychopharmacology: The Prescribers Guide Cambridge University Press, New York, New York, 2005. 2006. 2009. 2011. 2014. 2017. 2021. 2024.
- Stahl's Illustrated: Chronic Pain and Fibromyalgia. Cambridge University Press, New York, New York 2009.
- Stahl's Self Assessment Examination in Psychiatry: Multiple Choice Questions for Clinicians. Cambridge University Press, 2012. 2016.
- Shell Shock: A Gus Conrad Thriller, Harley House Press, 2015.

== Awards and distinctions ==
Year	Award	Awarding Body
1971	Illinois Psychiatric Society Award	Illinois Psychiatric Society
1973	Illinois Psychiatric Society Award	Illinois Psychiatric Society
1974	A.E. Bennett Award	Society of Biological Psychiatry
1977	Illinois Psychiatric Society Award	Illinois Psychiatric Society
2002	Lundbeck International Neuroscience Foundation Prize	International College of Neuropsychopharmacology
2004	Education Award	San Diego Psychiatric Society and the American Psychiatric Association
2009	Medical Book Competition Award	British Medical Association
2010	Book of the Year Award	British Medical Association
2011	Medical Book Competition Award	British Medical Association
2013	Distinguished Psychiatrist Award and Lecturer	American Psychiatric Association
2016	David A Mrazek Memorial Award and Lecturer	American Psychiatric Association
2018	Honorary Doctorate	Üsküdar University
2023	Lifetime Achievement Award for contributions to psychiatry	Sapienza University of Rome
2023	Distinguished International Figure in Psychiatry Lecture	University of Cambridge, UK
2024	Honorary Doctorate	University of Cambridge
2025	Inaugural Henry Nasrallah Award for Excellence in Psychopharmacology Education,	American Society of Clinical Psychopharmacology
2025	Exceptional Contribution Award in Mental Health, International Symposium on Suicidology and Public Health,	Sapienza University of Rome
