= Evelyn Namara =

Ugandan corporate executive

- Citizenship: Uganda
- Education: Bachelor of Science in Computer Science, Makerere University Diploma in Sustainable Business and Responsible Leadership, Sustainability Studies,The Swedish Institute Management Programme (SIMP)
- Employer: Global Digital Inclusion Partnership
- Known for: Being the first Ugandan to win the Anita Borg Change Agent Award
- Board member of: KCB Bank Uganda, MTN Mobile Money Uganda Limited, Village Enterprise

Evelyn Namara is a Ugandan technologist, technology entrepreneur and corporate executive who founded Vouch Digital in 2015. She serves as a non executive director on the KCB Bank Uganda Board of Directors, MTN Mobile Money Uganda Limited Boards of Directors and also serves on Village Enterprise Board. She is first Ugandan to win the Anita Borg Change Agent Award Winner in October 2012. She is the founder of Innovate Uganda

== Background and education ==
Namara was born in a family of four of which three of them are boys.

Namara graduated with a Bachelor of Science in computer science from Makerere university. She holds a Diploma in Sustainable Business and Responsible Leadership, Sustainability Studies from The Swedish Institute Management Programme (SIMP).

Namara holds a diploma in information technology from Uganda Institute of Information and Communications Technology. She got Cisco Certified Network Associate certification at Uganda Institute of Information and Communications Technology.

Namara attended a training in scalable internet services, Scalable Network Infrastructure by The African Network Operators Group (AfNOG).

In 2013, Namara was East Africa Regional fellow for the Acumen Fund East Africa Fellows Program.

In 2018, Namara attended an INSEAD Social Entrepreneurship Programme (ISEP).

In 2015, Namara was an IDEX Global Fellow under the IDEX Accelerator Global Fellows Program. In 2016, she was an ICANN58 fellow in March 2017.

Namara was part of the 2020 FORTUNE-UN Department of State Global Women's Mentoring Program.

Namara did her internship at One2Net where she specialized in UNIX programming.

== Career ==
Namara was among the women that formed the Defunct LinuxChix Africa in 2006. Namara is a founding member for Girl Geek Kampala.

Namara is the CEO and founder for Vouch Digital since 2015.

Namara worked as a systems administrator at Orange Uganda Limited from 2008 to 2011. She worked as country director for Solar Sister (a company that distributed solar lamps to rural women that have no access to electricity) from 2011 to 2013.

Namara worked as the regional manager for East Africa at Beyonic Inc in 2014.

From January to June 2015, Namara worked as the Implementation Manager for Blended Learning at Wings Learning Centres.

In November 2015, Namara was the ambassador to the United Nations Internet Governance Forum Ambassador to the United Nations Internet Governance Forum in Brazil as she was working Internet society. She was the returning ambassador to the United Nations Internet Governance Forum Ambassador as she was working Internet society in 2016 in Mexico.

Namara worked as the Vice Chair for the ICT Association of Uganda from January 2016 to October 2016.

Namara worked as the Eastern Africa coordinator for the Africa Civil Society on Information Society (ACSIS) from Nov 2016 - Mar 2018.

Namara also served as a Policy Outreach fellow at Internet Society from 2017 to 2018.

She worked as the Global ambassador for IAMTHECODE foundation from 2017 to 2019. Namara was a team member and contributor for Bridge17.org.

Namara worked as the Manager for Community Engagement and Special Interest Groups at the Internet Society from 2018 to 2021.

Namara worked as the project manager and researcher for Alliance for affordable Internet (A4AI) from November 2021 to October 2022.

Namara serves as an Independent Non Executive Director for MTN Mobile Money Uganda Limited since October 2021 to date (as on 2024). She also serves on the Refactory Advisory Board.

In 2022, Namara was appointed as an Independent Non Executive director for KCB Bank Uganda Board of Directors.

Namara is a member of the board of directors for Village Enterprise.

Namara worked as a Senior Partnerships Manager & Researcher from December 2022 to Jan 2024 at Global Digital Inclusion Partnership where she was promoted to the position of senior programs manager in January 2024.

Namara worked as a trainer and instructor for The Africa Network Operators Group (AfNOG) and AfCHIX.

Namara was a chair of the Change Agent ABIE Award selection committee.

== Founding of Vouch Digital ==
Namara joined The Innovation Village to pursue an entrepreneurship journey in technology. In 2015, she joined a team that wanted to develop a platform that would tackle fraud and corruption in international aid and donations from humanitarian agencies, unclear procurement and distribution processes.

Namara learnt about a development organisation that wanted to outsource a foreign company to build for them a system that would track and deliver entitlements to the last-mile. she was given a month to work on the project and also given an initial capital investment of $25,000 by that organization. She formed a team and they brainstormed on building an electronic voucher system that would be used to distribute entitlements, goods and services.

In 2016, Namara and her team developed their first prototype and implemented it with MercyCorps on projects in Northern Karamoja. She also worked with international NGOs including Catholic Relief Services and World Food Programme.

In 2019, Namara rebranded her company to Vouch, and wanted to develop an API that would fuel digital incentives by interacting with multiple software intermediaries. Vouch manages vouchers for NGOs, corporate businesses and governments to deliver digital entitlements across the world that can be redeemed at authorized merchants.

In 2020, Namara and her team had served more than 250,000 beneficiaries and transacted more than $3 billion with them in the Karamoja sub- region.

== Awards and recognitions ==
- Anita Borg ABIE Change Agent Award Winner in October 2012.
- 2013 Fellow for The Acumen Fund.
- Overall entrepreneur award in the Agriculture sector at the Women In Africa club Summit in Marrakesh, Morocco.
- The ICT For Development award at the Uganda Communications Commission ACIA Awards in May 2017.
- Woman Innovator of the year in 2017 and 2018 in MTN Innovation Awards.
- Finalist Cartier Women's Initiative Awards in 2018.
- Honoree, Top 100 Most Influential People of African Descent (MIPAD) Under 40, Business & Entrepreneurship Class of 2018, UN.
- Third winner in Africa Women Innovation and Entrepreneurship Forum Awards in 2019.

== See also ==
- Anne Juuko
- Sarah Arapta
- Patricia Ojangole
