= Jessica Jackley =

American entrepreneur (born 1977)

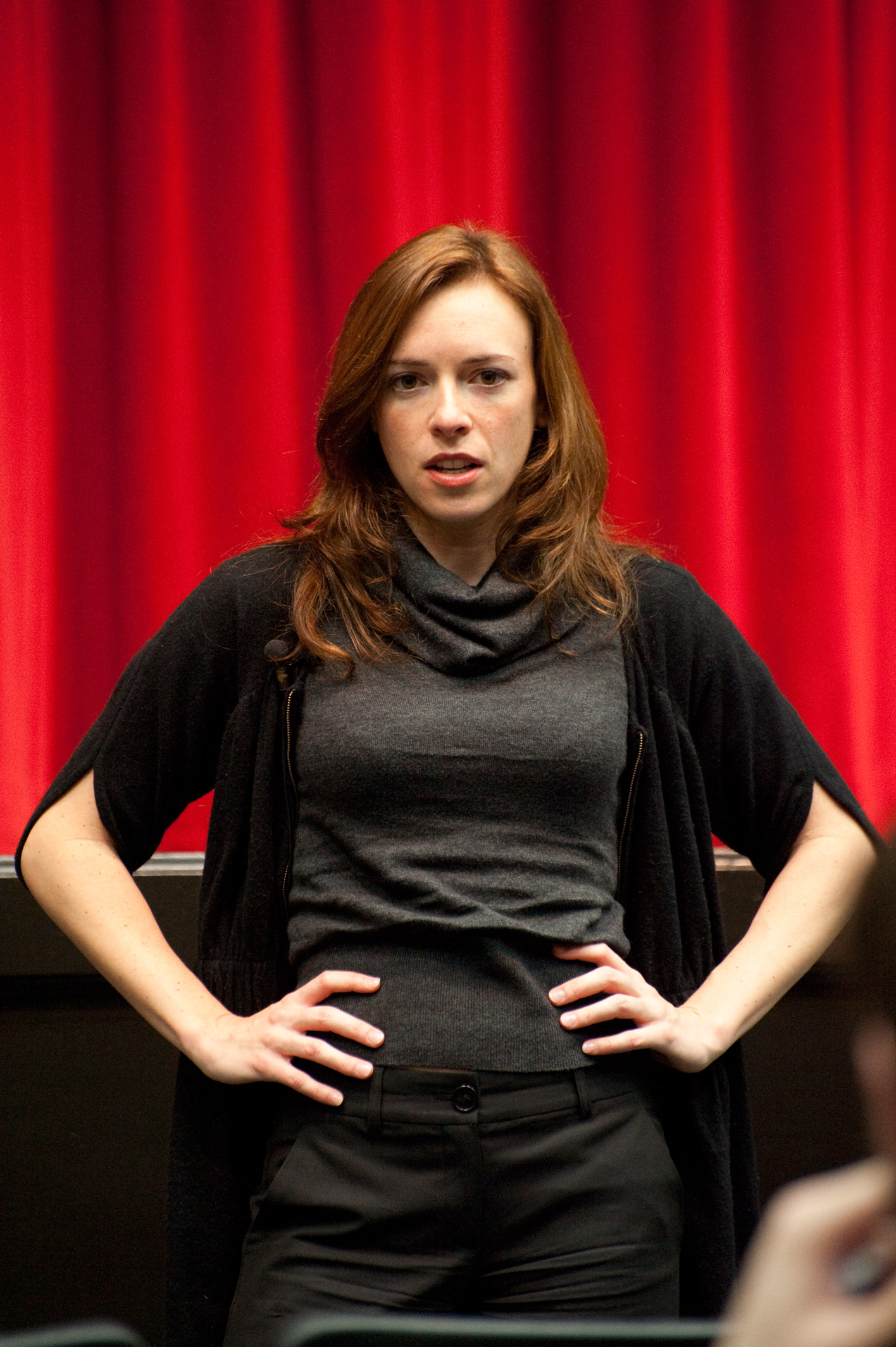
- Jackley in 2010
- Born: October 29, 1977 (age 48)
- Education: Bucknell University (B.A. 2000); Stanford Business School (M.B.A.)
- Occupations: Co-founder & CMO, Kiva.org; Co-founder & CEO, ProFounder
- Spouses: Matt Flannery (m. 2003; div. 2008) Reza Aslan (m. 2011)
- Children: 4
- Website: JessicaJackley.com

Jessica Erin Jackley (born October 29, 1977) is an American entrepreneur who co-founded Kiva and later ProFounder, two organizations that promote development through microloans.

== Early life ==
Jackley grew up in Franklin Park, Pennsylvania. She graduated from North Allegheny Senior High School in 1996. She received her B.A. degree in philosophy and political science from Bucknell University in 2000 and an M.B.A. from the Stanford Graduate School of Business, with certificates in Public and Global Management.

== Career ==
Jackley was the co-founder and CEO of ProFounder, a platform that provided tools for small business entrepreneurs in the United States to access start-up capital through crowdfunding and community involvement.

Prior to ProFounder, Jackley and her then-husband Matt Flannery co-founded Kiva, the world's first person-to-person microlending website in 2005, with Jackley serving as chief marketing officer of Kiva.

Jackley is a visiting scholar at Stanford University’s Center for Philanthropy and Civil Society, and has taught global entrepreneurship at the Marshall School of Business at USC. She is a member of the Council on Foreign Relations, a 2011 World Economic Forum's Young Global Leader, and serves as an active board member on several organizations championing women, microfinance, tech, and the arts, including Opportunity International, the International Museum of Women, and Allowance for Good.

Jackley has worked in Kenya, Tanzania, and Uganda with Village Enterprise and Project Baobab. Jackley also spent three years in the Stanford GSB's Center for Social Innovation and Public Management Program, where she helped launch the inaugural Global Philanthropy Forum.

Jackley is a mentor of The Girl Effect Accelerator, a two-week business accelerator program that aims to scale startups in emerging markets that are best positioned to impact millions of girls in poverty.

== Personal life ==
Jackley was previously married to Matt Flannery, co-founder of Kiva. She currently lives in Los Angeles with her second husband, professor and author Reza Aslan, and their four children. She is a Christian.
