= YiNongDai =

Chinese peer-to-peer lending platform

YiNongDa
- Type: NBFC
- Industry: Finance
- Founded: Sep 2009
- Headquarters: Beijing, China
- Area served: China
- Key people: Ning Tang (Chairman); Chao Xu (Director)
- Website: http://www.yinongdai.com/

YND (YiNongDai, Chinese: 宜农贷) is one of the largest online P2P (peer-to-peer) lending platforms in China. It allows people to lend directly to women in rural area, especially the Northwest China. YND is a social enterprise based in Beijing, China. It is supported mainly by individual lenders from the Internet.

== History ==
YND was founded in September 2009 by Ning Tang. During his graduate study, Ning Tang visited the Grameen Bank in Bangladesh in 1997, following Prof. Muhammad Yunus, who later was awarded the 2006 Nobel Peace Prize, along with Grameen Bank, for his effort in socioeconomic development and poverty alleviation in Bangladesh. In 2009, Ning Tang founded YND to convey the concept that "Everyone has credit. Credit has value".

== Operations ==
YND collaborates with local microfinance institutions in China, allowing them to post profiles of credible rural borrowers on its platform. Currently YND has 7 local partners, the Anti-poverty Economic Cooperatives in Henan Province, Women Development Association in Shaanxi Province, R&P Microfinance Service Center in Gansu Province, Pinnan Microfinance Association in Fujian Province, Laishui Anti-poverty Economic Cooperatives in Hebei Province, Datong LPAC Project Office in Qinghai Province, and the People's Microfinance Company in Ningxia Province. In the some poor villages of Ningxia Province, the family income of a household of 4 is less than CNY 20,000 a year (equivalent to US$3,130).

The local microfinance institution will firstly make a loan to a qualified rural woman and post her profile to YND platform. Lenders can browse and choose a borrower they wish to fund. They need to open an account on YND platform, and transfer money to this account. YND will then transfer the money to the respective local Microfinance institution. Once the loan is repaid, the local microfinance institution will transfer the money back to the lender's account on YND platform. The lender is free to keep on lending or to withdraw his/her money.

== Updates ==
A single loan could be from CNY 2,000 to 5,000. The rural borrower could use the money to buy feed and seed, to add additional livestocks, or simply to expand their business. Up to 5 September 2011, YND has successfully helped 1537 rural women with 21035 donations from 23895 Internet donors. The total amount of loans is CNY 4,898,894 (equivalent to US$766,892).

== See also ==
- Social entrepreneurship
- Wokai
- Kiva (organization)
