= Kiva (organization) =

Micro-loan platform

Kiva Microfunds
- Founded: October 2005
- Founders: Premal Shah; Jessica Jackley; Matt Flannery
- Tax ID no.: 71-0992446
- Purpose: Economic development
- Location: San Francisco, California, United States
- Region served: World-wide
- Method: Microcredit
- Key people: Vishal Ghotge (CEO)
- Revenue: $34,727,565 (2023)
- Expenses: $37,635,582 (2023)
- Endowment: $27,389,839
- Staff: 170 (2023)
- Volunteers: 450 (2015)
- Website: kiva.org

Kiva Microfunds is a 501(c)(3) non-profit organization headquartered in San Francisco, California. Kiva distributes funds that it receives to microfinance institutions, social impact businesses, schools or non-profit organizations and does not generally directly provide funds to specific individuals. These organizations are charged fees by Kiva and borrowers pay interest on most loans.

Kiva is supported by grants, loans, and donations from its users, corporations, and national institutions. Since 2005, Kiva has crowd-funded more than 1.6 million loans, totaling over $1.68 billion, with a repayment rate of 96.3 percent. Over 2 million lenders worldwide use the Kiva platform. An independent review by GiveWell in 2009 failed to find evidence that the organization produces significant social benefit, with at least one partner supposedly vetted by Kiva earning high profits while having a very high recipient drop-out rate.

== History ==
Early Kiva field partners (September 2006)

Kiva was founded in October 2005 by Matt Flannery and Jessica Jackley. The couple's initial interest in microfinance was inspired by a 2003 lecture given by Grameen Bank's Muhammad Yunus at Stanford Business School. Jackley worked at the school and invited Flannery to attend the presentation. Soon after, Jackley began working as a consultant for the nonprofit Village Enterprise, which worked to help start small businesses in East Africa. While Flannery was visiting Jackley in Africa, the two spent time interviewing entrepreneurs about the problems they faced in starting ventures and found the lack of access to start-up capital was a common theme. After returning from Africa, the two began developing their plan for a microfinance project that would grow into Kiva, which means "unity" in Swahili.

In April 2005, Kiva's first seven loans were funded, totaling $3,500, and the original entrepreneurs were subsequently deemed the "Dream Team".

== Lending process ==
Kiva works with more than 300 microfinance institutions, social impact businesses, schools and non-profit organizations around the world, called "Field Partners", that post profiles of qualified local entrepreneurs on the Kiva website. Lenders browse borrower profiles on kiva.org and choose an entrepreneur they wish to fund. The lenders transfer their funds to Kiva through credit card processing or PayPal, which waives its transaction fee in these cases. Lenders can loan money in increments of $25.

After receiving lenders' money, Kiva aggregates loan capital from the individual lenders and transfers it to the appropriate Field Partners, which disburse the loan to the borrower. Kiva does not charge interest on the capital sent to Field Partners, but often Field Partners do charge some level of interest to borrowers to cover administration costs. Interest is typically higher on loans from microfinance institutions in developing countries than interest rates on larger loans in developed countries because of the administrative costs of overseeing many tiny loans, and the increased risk. As the entrepreneurs repay their loans with interest, the Field Partners remit funds back to Kiva. As the loan is repaid, the Kiva lenders can withdraw their principal or re-lend it to another entrepreneur.

== Finances ==
As of March 15, 2016, Kiva had distributed $827,356,850 in loans from 1,394,336 lenders to 1,928,760 borrowers, and a total of 1,036,558 loans had been funded through Kiva. The average loan size is $411.26, and the average Kiva user has made 10.17 loans. Kiva's current repayment rate for all its partners is 97.1%.

For the fiscal year 2012, Kiva made $15,632,786 in total revenue and had $12,482,528 in total expenses, leaving $3,150,258 to invest. The organization's net assets in 2012 totaled $16,248,638. Kiva itself does not charge interest on its loans; they supply capital to microfinancing institutions for free. These microfinancing institutions then lend out money with high interest compared to bank finance in mature markets, averaging a portfolio yield of over 30%. The organization's main sources of funding are grants, financial backing, and discounted services from many major national corporations and institutions. Chevron Corporation, Visa Inc., and Skoll Foundation awarded Kiva a two-year $1 million grant, $1.5 million grant, and $1 million grant respectively. Kiva also won a $1 million grant in Sam's Club's "Giving Made Simple" campaign and $500,000 in American Express's "Take Part" competition. Additionally, Omidyar Network awarded Kiva a $5 million grant over five years to help Kiva expand its field partners and support due diligence.

=== Management ===
In 2023, according to their 990 tax form, Kiva's then-CEO Neville Crawley's salary was $424,238. Their total revenue in 2023 was $34.7M. The non-profit had thirteen staff members with salaries ranging from $200,000 to over $400,000 that year. Kiva began paying interns in 2019.

== Areas of work and loan use ==
=== Female-owned businesses ===
As of October 2017, 81% of Kiva's loans have been made to women.

In their non-fiction book Half the Sky, Nicholas D. Kristof and Sheryl WuDunn highlight Kiva's work along with that of some field partner organizations, such as the Kashf Foundation in Pakistan. Kristof and WuDunn noted the risky nature of microloans as a path out of poverty, but endorsed Kiva and similar microfinance efforts, writing that "microfinance has done more to bolster the status of women, and to protect them from abuse, than any laws could accomplish."

=== Green loans ===
In 2011 Kiva added a new category of loans to help borrowers move to cleaner and safer forms of energy, green agriculture, transport and recycling. Green Kiva loans help fund solar panels, organic fertilizers, high-efficiency stoves, drip irrigation systems, and biofuels. As of December 2013, Kiva lenders had crowd-funded 4,600 green loans.

=== Support for higher education ===
In 2010, Kiva began a Student Microloans program that allowed lenders to help support students seeking access to higher education. Student loans are funded with the same crowd-funding approach, and typically students have 1–3 years to pay back their loans.

In 2014, the education offerings on Kiva expanded greatly when the organization began a deeper partnership with Vittana. Vittana works on the ground in countries in Asia, Africa and Latin America, developing loan alternatives for low-income students. Through the partnership, all loans sourced by Vittana now appear on Kiva for funding.

=== Medical loans ===
Some Kiva field partners, such as Alivio Capital, specialize in funding medical loans. Others may fund medical loans as well as other loans. A development scholar in Ghana has suggested that microfinance medical loans can be an effective way to close the gap in medical care access in developing countries.

=== Support for refugees ===
In July 2017, Kiva launched a World Refugee Fund, a $250,000 matching fund to provide support to refugees and host communities in countries including Lebanon, Jordan, and Turkey. As refugees repay the loans, they build a track record in their new locations. The fund is to be followed by a rotating fund of up to $9M in loan capital.

== Other Kiva programs ==
=== Kiva U.S. ===
In 2011, Kiva launched Kiva U.S., a 0% interest peer-to-peer lending pilot program for entrepreneurs in the United States, as part of efforts to "cut lending costs through technology". The loans posted to Kiva U.S. are often from borrowers who have been rejected for loans by traditional banking institutions, but on Kiva U.S. they do not need to be able to produce high credit scores or collateral. Kiva U.S. uses a system of trustees, who vouch for the borrowers. Kiva U.S. trustees can be local non-profits, service organizations, businesses, faith organizations or community leaders.

The average loan size for US borrowers is $5,000. US borrowers average about two years to repay loans.

=== Kiva Labs ===
Google awarded a $3 million Global Impact Award to Kiva in 2013 to fund the Kiva Labs project, which looks for ways to increase the flexibility and impact of microfinance. Labs initiatives include lowering interest rates, providing more flexible repayment terms that accommodate issues like seasonal profits in farming, and offering longer-term loans for investments like education. Labs also focuses on providing access to clean energy technology and using mobile technology in ways that will bridge the knowledge gap. At the time of the lab's launch, Kiva lenders had crowdfunded "132,000 agricultural loans; 4,600 green loans, and 670 mobile tech loans."

=== Kiva City ===
Kiva City provides local business owners and entrepreneurs in U.S. cities with the opportunity to crowdsource loans. It was launched by Kiva and former US President Bill Clinton at the Clinton Global Initiative America conference in Chicago in 2011. Kiva City locations include: Detroit, New Orleans, Los Angeles, Washington D.C., Newark, Richmond, Little Rock, Pittsburgh, Philadelphia, Milwaukee, Louisville, San Francisco, New York City, and Oakland.

In less than a year, the Kiva City programs in Richmond, Virginia, helped fund more than $100,000 in loans to local businesses.

== Controversies ==
=== Lenders on strike ===
A group of Kiva lenders are protesting Kiva controversial practices. They have formed a group on Kiva's website called Lenders on Strike.

=== Interest rates ===
As of November 2018, a total of 1,530,180 loans had been funded on Kiva. The following table shows these loans sorted according to interest rate.

Interest rate	Number of loans
0%	150,615
0.5-10%	5,570
10.5-20%	152,926
20.5-30%	387,677
30.5-40%	334,205
40.5-50%	330,354
50.5-60%	116,154
60.5% +	51,026
No interest rate listed	1,653
Total	1,530,180

Some people, including microfinance pioneer Muhammad Yunus, argue that the interest rates of many microcredit institutions are unreasonably high. In his 2007 book he argues that microfinance institutions that charge more than 15% above their long-term operating costs should face penalties.

According to its website, Kiva quotes interest rates as the "self reported average rate charged by the Field Partner to the entrepreneur." Kiva does not publish the interest rates charged for the individual loans funded through its website. However, it does publish the average "Portfolio Yield" of each of its field partners, as a way for prospective lenders to estimate the cost to the borrower of the loans they consider funding. The "Portfolio Yield" measures the average income earned from the field partner's outstanding loan portfolio. Some observers have pointed out that the "Portfolio Yield" measure is unreliable, and does not directly reflect the actual price that borrowers are paying for the loans.

Kiva defends the interest rates of its field partners, however, saying its field partners provide much better rates than local alternatives, but must charge what they do because "the costs of making a micro-loan in the developing world are higher versus larger loans in the West." Kiva itself does not keep any of the interest collected, but operates instead exclusively on donations.

For example, in 2009, micro-loans from Kiva partners in Guatemala averaged 23.16% for the equivalent of US$430 lent on average, comparable to the commercial BanRural rate of 24.5% for a loan of US$635. (For reference, the inflation rate for Guatemala typically varies between 5 and 10% and was just 0.62% in 2009).

Kiva launched a more direct peer-to-peer microlending platform, called Kiva Zip, in 2012. Kiva Zip transferred funds directly to borrowers without outsourcing disbursements and repayment collection to field partners. Instead, the program partnered with local institutions in the United States and Kenya called Trustees, who vetted loan applicants and provided mentorship. Kiva Zip borrowers did not pay any interest or fees and the repayment rate was 89.4%. As of March 13, 2017, the Kiva Zip subdomain redirects to the Kiva homepage, and the program appears to be discontinued.

==== Interest rates by field partner ====
As of November 2018, there are a total of 332 field partners listed on the Kiva website and their status is as follows: 173 Active, 41 Inactive, 14 Paused, and 104 Experimental. In addition, 178 former field partners are listed as Closed.

The following table shows the "portfolio yield" of a sampling of field partners. "Portfolio yield" figures are calculated by dividing all interest and fees paid by borrowers to the field partner by the average loan portfolio of the field partner that given year. The figure provides a more accurate insight into the costs of borrowing because it includes fees associated with borrowing.

Field partner	Region	Portfolio yield %	Status	Correct on
IMPRO	Bolivia	20	Active	Nov. 10, 2018
Fundación Pro Mujer	Bolivia	32	Active	Nov. 10, 2018
KREDIT, a partner of World Relief	Cambodia	23	Active	Nov. 10, 2018
Hattha Kaksekar Limited (HKL), a partner of Save the Children	Cambodia, Thailand	20	Active	Nov. 10, 2018
MAXIMA Microfinance	Cambodia	22	Active	Nov. 10, 2018
Grounded and Holistic Approach for People's Empowerment (GHAPE)	Cameroon	20	Active	Nov. 10, 2018
Esperanza International Dominican Republic, a partner of HOPE International	Dominican Republic	39	Active	Nov. 10, 2018
Fundación ESPOIR	Ecuador	29	Active	Nov. 10, 2018
The Foundation for Assistance for Small Businesses (FAPE)	Guatemala	49	Active	Nov. 10, 2018
Prisma Honduras	Honduras	43	Active	Nov. 10, 2018
Koperasi Mitra Usaha Kecil (MUK)	Indonesia	23	Active	Nov. 10, 2018
VisionFund Kenya	Kenya	36	Active	Nov. 10, 2018
Al Majmoua Lebanese Association for Development	Lebanon	31	Active	Nov. 10, 2018
Vitas - Lebanon	Lebanon	32	Active	Nov. 10, 2018
Patan Business and Professional Women (BPW Patan)	Nepal	19	Active	Nov. 10, 2018
ADIM (Asociación Alternativa Para el Desarrollo Integral de las Mujeres)	Nicaragua	57	Active	Nov. 10, 2018
AFODENIC	Nicaragua	21	Active	Nov. 10, 2018
Palestine for Credit & Development (FATEN)	Palestine, Jordan	15	Active	Nov. 10, 2018
Fundación Paraguaya	Paraguay	40	Active	Nov. 12, 2018
Asociación Arariwa	Peru	36	Active	Nov. 12, 2018
EDAPROSPO	Peru	41	Active	Nov. 12, 2018
ASKI	Philippines	21	Active	Nov. 12, 2018
Community Economic Ventures, Inc. (CEVI), a partner of VisionFund International	Philippines	60	Active	Nov. 12, 2018
Gata Daku Multi-purpose Cooperative (GDMPC)	Philippines	25	Active	Nov. 12, 2018
Paglaum Multi-Purpose Cooperative (PMPC)	Philippines	28	Active	Nov. 12, 2018
VisionFund Rwanda	Rwanda	41	Active	Nov. 12, 2018
South Pacific Business Development (SPBD)	Samoa	45	Active	Nov. 12, 2018
Caurie Microfinance, a partner of Catholic Relief Services	Senegal	20	Active	Nov. 12, 2018
UIMCEC, a partner of ChildFund International	Senegal	19	Active	Nov. 12, 2018
Tujijenge Tanzania Ltd	Tanzania	66	Active	Nov. 12, 2018
IMON International	Tajikistan	31	Active	Nov. 12, 2018
Humo	Tajikistan	40	Active	Nov. 12, 2018
BRAC Uganda	Uganda	60	Active	Nov. 12, 2018
Thanh Hoa Microfinance Institution	Vietnam	19	Active	Nov. 12, 2018
CIDRE	Bolivia	19	Active	Nov. 12, 2018
Kashf Foundation	Pakistan	39% PY	Active	Nov. 8, 2018
Credo	Georgia	30	Active	Nov. 8, 2018
Fondesurco	Peru	32	Active	Nov. 8, 2018
One Acre Fund	Kenya, Tanzania	18% APR	Active	Nov. 8, 2018
Organizacion de Desarrollo Empresarial Femenino (ODEF)	Honduras	34	Active	Nov. 8, 2018
CrediCampo	El Salvador	29	Active	Nov. 8, 2018
VisionFund Ecuador	Ecuador	23	Active	Nov. 8, 2018
National Microfinance Bank	Jordan	37	Active	Nov. 8, 2018
MiCredito	Nicaragua	38	Active	Nov. 8, 2018
Bai Tushum Bank	Kyrgyzstan	21	Active	Nov. 8, 2018
SEF International	Armenia	26	Active	Nov. 8, 2018
Cooperativa San Jose	Ecuador	15	Active	Nov. 8, 2018
Negros Women for Tomorrow Foundation (NWTF)	Philippines	46	Active	Nov. 8, 2018
Edpyme Alternativa	Peru	37	Active	Nov. 8, 2018
Cooperativa de Ahorro y Crédito Mujeres Unidas (CACMU)	Ecuador	17	Active	Nov. 8, 2018
FUNDAPEC	Dominican Republic	5% APR	Active	Nov. 8, 2018
Kaebauk Investimentu no Finansas	Timor-Leste	28	Active	Nov. 8, 2018
ID Ghana	Ghana	48	Active	Nov. 8, 2018
Strathmore University	Kenya	4% APR	Active	Nov. 8, 2018
Interactuar	Colombia	33	Active	Nov. 8, 2018
Juhudil Kilimo	Kenya	41	Active	Nov. 8, 2018
Fundación Mario Santo Domingo (FMSD)	Colombia	40	Active	Nov. 8, 2018
Banque Populaire du Rwanda (BPR)	Rwanda	N/A	Active	Nov. 8, 2018
Cooperativa de Ahorro y Crédito Norandino	Peru	31% APR	Active	Nov. 8, 2018
Réseau de Micro-institutions de Croissance de Revenus (RMCR)	Mali	26	Active	Nov. 8, 2018
Artisan Alliance at The Aspen Institute	United States, Nigeria, Nepal, Mali, Kyrgyzstan, Ghana, Mexico, India, Cambodia, Kenya, Uganda	0%	Active	Nov. 8, 2018
Ibdaa Microfinance	Lebanon	40	Active	Nov. 8, 2018
Kenya ECLOF	Kenya	40	Active	Nov. 8, 2018
Camfed Zimbabwe	Zimbabwe	0% APR	Active	Nov. 8, 2018
Babban Gana Farmers Organization	Nigeria	18% APR	Active	Nov. 8, 2018
UGAFODE Microfinance	Uganda	51	Active	Nov. 8, 2018
Arvand	Tajikistan	32	Active	Nov. 8, 2018
Zoona	Zambia, Malawi	N/A	Active	Nov. 8, 2018
PADECOMSM	El Salvador	33	Active	Nov. 8, 2018
HOFOKAM	Uganda	47	Active	Nov. 8, 2018
ADICLA	Guatemala	51	Active	Nov. 12, 2018
Hluvuku-Adsema	Mozambique	50	Active	Nov. 12, 2018
Thrive Microfinance	Zimbabwe	69% APR	Active	Nov. 12, 2018
Microhub Financial Services (Pvt) Ltd	Zimbabwe	74% APR	Active	Nov. 12, 2018
Advans Ghana	Ghana	78% APR	Active	Nov. 12, 2018

=== Pre-disbursement of funds ===
When Kiva began, borrowers had to wait until their loans were funded on the Kiva website to receive the funds. Since then, the system has changed, so that loans are disbursed to borrowers before their stories are posted to Kiva's website. Disbursing loans sooner has a positive impact on the borrowers, who no longer need to wait weeks to receive their funding and can thus take advantage of time-sensitive business opportunities. This is disclosed on Kiva's site; each loan proposal states whether funds were pre-disbursed. Thus, lenders' loan funds are likely to go to borrowers other than those chosen by the lenders. However, since the pay-back behaviour of the specific borrower chosen by the lender does influence whether or not the lender gets their funds back (except when an MFI has chosen to cover for borrower defaults), there is at least some connection between the lender and the specific borrower. Whether lenders' preferences are used for lender preference trend analysis by any field partners or Kiva is not stated. Kiva's response has been to keep pre-disbursing but be clearer about the process.

=== Full-repayment frequency uncertainty ===
Whether defaults are extremely low has been questioned on the ground that a field partner may pay Kiva for loans defaulted to the field partner in order to maintain the field partner's good credit with Kiva. Whether interest rates collected by field partners are enough to pay for significant defaults depends on local economic conditions for each field partner.

=== Controversial loans ===
In 2008, Kiva featured the borrowing profile of a Peruvian woman asking for a loan to buy equipment for her cockfighting business. This sparked debate among the Kiva lending community; many complained that the organization was promoting animal cruelty. Matt Flannery defended Kiva's decision to allow the post to remain; he asserted that removing the post would be "paternalistic" and that "Cockfighting in Peru is legal and part of a rich cultural tradition," adding that lenders could "be the ones voting with their dollars."

== Promotions and marketing strategies ==
In March 2012, Reid Hoffman, LinkedIn's co-founder, lent Kiva $1 million. Kiva then allowed 40,000 people to lend $25 for "free". Lenders still choose a borrower, but the borrower will pay back Hoffman instead of the lender who chose them. Kiva hopes that the "free" users will lend to more of their projects, and thus increase their overall user base.

In his 2007 book Giving: How Each of Us Can Change the World, Bill Clinton covers Kiva.org and the work the organization is currently doing and has done in the past.

== External reviews ==
The following independent entities have reviewed Kiva.

- On October 1, 2019, charity evaluator Charity Navigator downgraded Kiva from 4 (out of 4) to 3 stars, but by 2020 it was rated 4 stars again. Kiva has been top-rated at 4 stars since 2010 (with the exception of 2018 through mid-2019).
- In 2013, foundation Google.org conducted extensive due diligence on Kiva and awarded it a $3 million Global Impact Award for the creation of Kiva Labs.
- In 2012, charity evaluator Philanthropedia awarded Kiva its Top Non-Profit Award based on topic area expert opinions.
- In 2011, The Economist honored Kiva with its Innovation Award.
- In 2010, foundation Omidyar Network conducted extensive due diligence and awarded Kiva a $5 million grant to scale its impact.
- In 2010, Kiva was selected as one of Oprah's Ultimate Favorite Things.
- In 2009, charity evaluator GiveWell published a generic critique of giving marketplaces including Kiva and Global Giving, and specific critiques of Kiva.
- In 2008, TIME magazine named Kiva a Top 50 website.
- In 2007, Skoll Foundation conducted extensive due diligence and awarded Kiva a $1 million grant as part of its recognition of the world's best social enterprises.

== See also ==
- Flat rate (finance)
- List of microfinance sponsors
- Microcredit
- Microcredit Summit Campaign
- Social entrepreneurship
- United Prosperity
- Vittana
- Wokai
- Zidisha
