= Watsi =

Nonprofit healthcare crowdsourcing platform

Watsi, Inc.
- Founded: May 23, 2011; 15 years ago
- Founder: Chase Adam; Grace Garey; Jesse Cooke; Howard Glenn
- Type: 501(c)(3) nonprofit organization
- Tax ID no.: 45-3236734
- Location: San Francisco, California
- Region served: Developing countries
- Services: Funding medical treatment
- Method: Crowd funding
- Ops: Chase Adam
- Key people: Jon Skaggs, Mary Everette Cann, Dr. Mitul Kapadia, Dinkar Jain, Paul Graham, Howard Glenn, Mark Murrin
- Revenue: $2,268,111 (2024)
- Expenses: $2,482,900 (2024)
- Employees: 5 (2024)
- Volunteers: 4 (2024)
- Website: watsi.org

Watsi, legally Watsi, Inc., is a nonprofit healthcare crowdsourcing platform that enables individual donors to directly fund medical care for individuals in developing countries without access to affordable medical care. It takes its name from the town of Watsi in Costa Rica.

== Background ==
Watsi was the first nonprofit funded by seed accelerator Y Combinator. They have also been funded by the Draper Richards Kaplan Foundation.

In November 2015 the company announced a $3.5M growth round of donations led by 12 investors including Paul Graham, Tencent, and The Pershing Square Foundation. By early 2016 it was distributing about $1.6 million a year to patients in 23 countries, and by later that year the San Francisco Chronicle reported that the figure had reached $2.6 million and some 10,000 patients in a single fiscal year.

Medical partners included Nyaya Health, Dr. Rick Hodes, Wuqu' Kawoq, Children's Surgical Centre, CURE International, African Mission Healthcare Foundation, Hope for West Africa, Project Muso, Lwala Community Alliance, Living Hope Haiti, Floating Doctors, Burma Border Projects, Partner for Surgery, International Care Ministries, The Kellermann Foundation, and World Altering Medicine.

In 2014, Watsi's old logo, which had a blue cross with a white triangle, was the subject of a trademark suit from the Blue Cross Blue Shield Association, leading the company to change their logo to white triangles on a blue circle.

== Model ==
Donors browse individual patient listings, each of which sets out the person's background and medical condition and the specific procedure a given sum would pay for, and are told afterwards what became of the case. Watsi undertakes that the whole of a donation earmarked for a named patient goes to that patient's care, and raises money for its own administrative costs separately. Because treatment costs in the countries served are low by comparison with the United States, listed sums are small: the Chronicle cited a hernia repair for a Ugandan laborer at $249 and cataract surgery for a rice farmer at $292.
