= Alejandro Zaffaroni =

American businessman and biotechnology entrepreneur

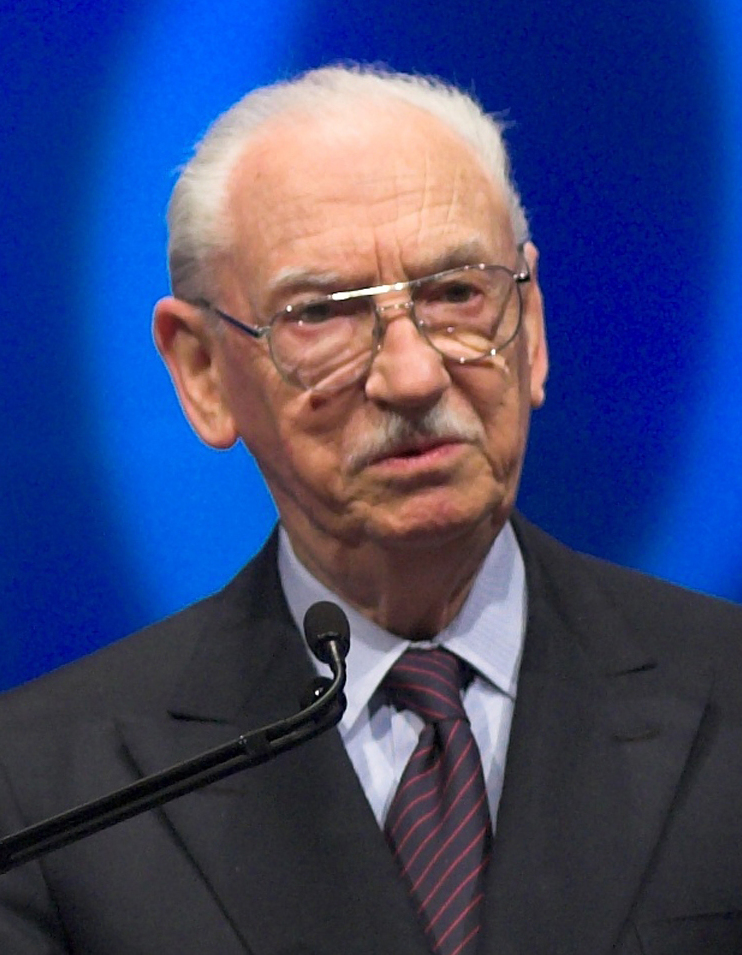
- Zaffaroni in 2006
- Born: February 27, 1923; Montevideo, Uruguay
- Died: March 1, 2014 (aged 91); Atherton, California, US
- Education: University of the Republic (BSc); University of Rochester (PhD)
- Spouse: Lida Zaffaroni
- Scientific career
- Thesis: The Application of Paper Partition Chromatography to Steroid Analysis (1950)

Alejandro Zaffaroni (February 27, 1923 – March 1, 2014) was a Uruguayan serial entrepreneur who was responsible for founding several biotechnology companies in Silicon Valley. Products that he was involved in developing include the birth control pill, the nicotine patch, corticosteroids, and the DNA microarray.

== Education ==
Zaffaroni was born on February 27, 1923, in Montevideo. Zaffaroni was of Italian descent, as his grandfather migrated from Italy to Uruguay at the age of 16. Both of Zaffaroni's parents died early in his life; his mother when he was 12 and his father when he was 18. His father was in the banking business. Zaffaroni received his Bachelor of Science degree from the University of the Republic in 1945, and his Ph.D. in biochemistry from the University of Rochester in 1949.

== Career ==
Zaffaroni joined Syntex, then a small chemical company in Mexico, as a biochemist in 1951. He participated in turning Syntex into a major multinational pharmaceutical company, moving it to Palo Alto, California. He was appointed president of the U.S. subsidiary in 1962.

In 1968, he founded ALZA, a syllabic abbreviation of his name, to develop medical treatments through controlled drug delivery. He modeled new delivery systems after the processes discovered in endocrinology – where glands deliver very small amounts of hormones but have a tremendous effect –.

ALZA's first controlled drug delivery product was used to treat glaucoma. Other products that incorporated Zaffaroni's drug delivery technologies include Glucotrol, for non insulin-dependent diabetes; Duragesic, for management of severe chronic pain; NicoDerm CQ, for smoking cessation; and Transderm-Scop, to prevent nausea and vomiting associated with motion sickness.

In 1980, Zaffaroni established DNAX, a developer of macromolecular products that combines the technologies of genetic engineering and immunobiology.

In 1988 he co-founded Affymax, specializing in combinatorial chemistry to reduce the cost and time of identifying new medicines.

In 1991 he co-founded Affymetrix, specializing in using genetics for developing new medicine. He was also involved in the creation of Perlegen Sciences, an Affymetrix spin-off which works on finding genetic causes of disease.

In 1994, he founded Symyx Technologies, a company dedicated to utilizing combinatorial chemistry technologies.

Other companies he founded include Maxygen (1997), a developer of technologies that improve the development of proteins and genetic elements, and SurroMed, focusing on the development of technologies for surrogate disease markers. In 2000, he founded Alexza Pharmaceuticals, a company working on rapid onset of action drug delivery technologies.

He died at his home at Atherton, California, on March 1, 2014 from complications of dementia. He was 91.

== Awards and honors ==
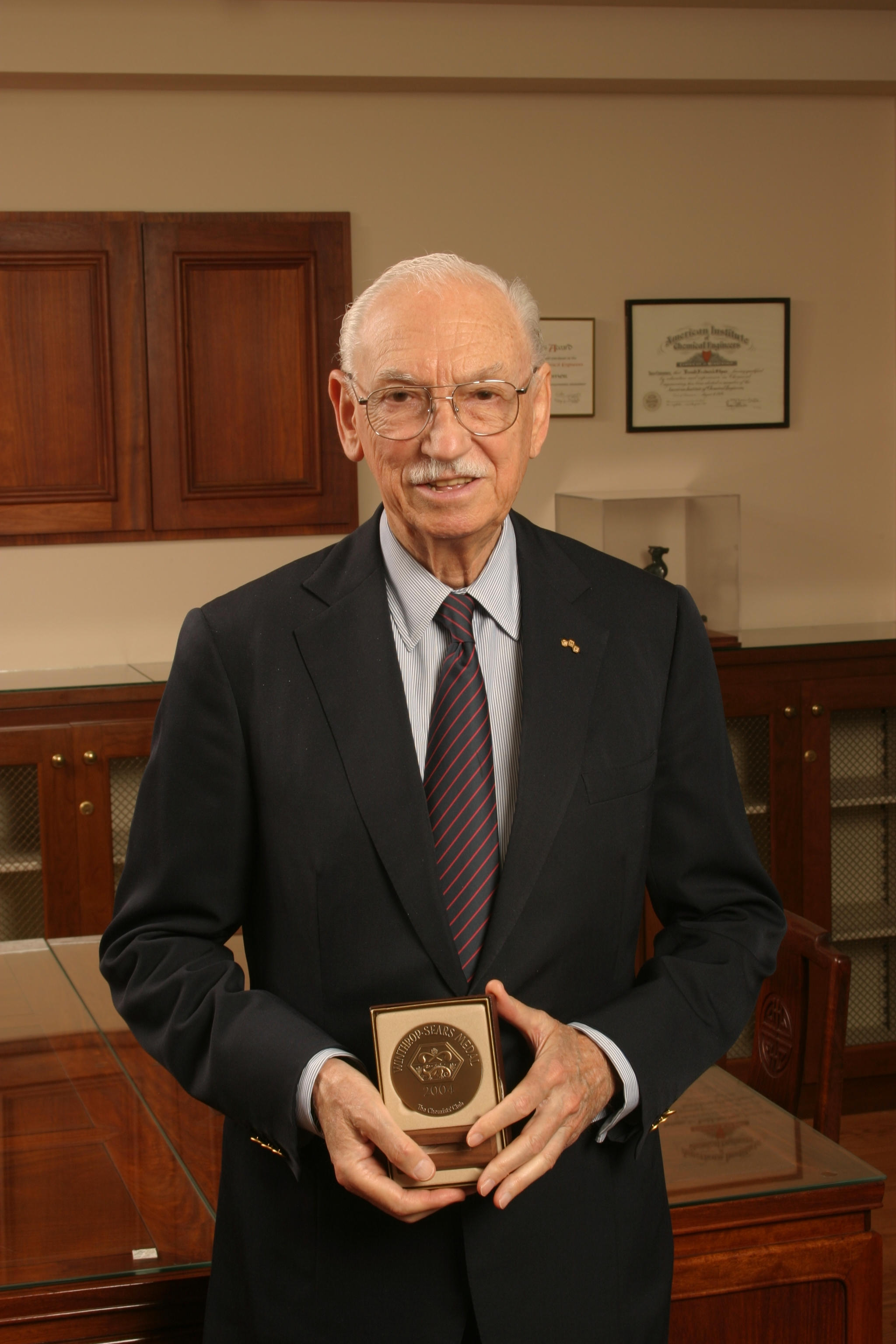
Zaffaroni receiving the Winthrop–Sears Medal, 2004

In 1979 Zaffaroni was awarded the Chemical Pioneer Award by the American Institute of Chemists In 1995, he received the National Medal of Technology from President Bill Clinton for his contributions to the pharmaceutical and biotechnology industries. In 2004, he was one of the recipients of the Winthrop-Sears Medal from the Chemical Heritage Foundation and The Chemists’ Club, with George Rosenkranz. In 2005 he received the Bower Award for Business Leadership from the Franklin Institute for his creation of new biochemical processes and drug delivery technologies. In 2005 he was awarded the Gregory Pincus Award from the Worcester Foundation. In 2006, he received the Biotechnology Heritage Award, from the Biotechnology Industry Organization (BIO) and the Chemical Heritage Foundation.
