= Alza =

American pharmaceutical and medical systems company (1968–2001)

Alza Corporation
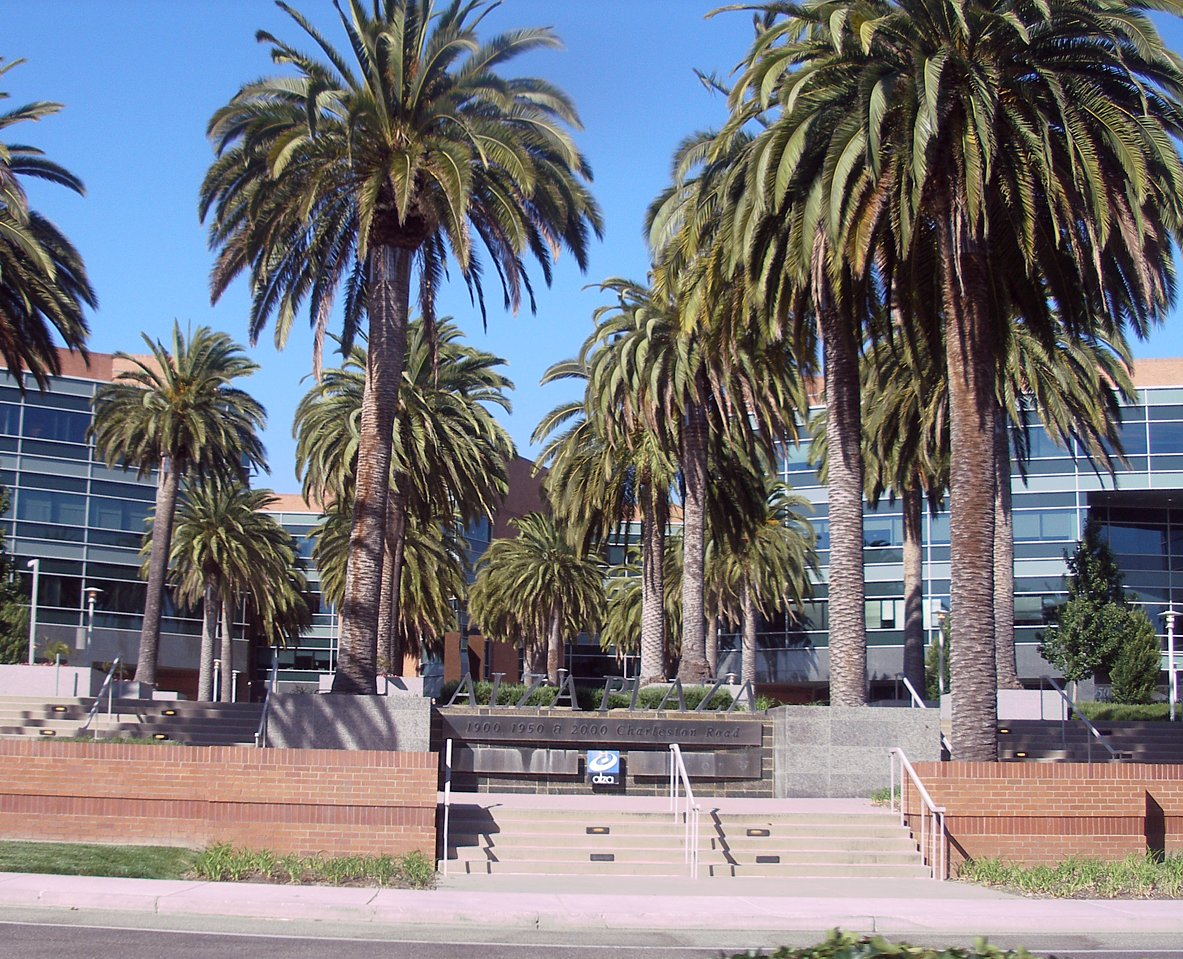
- Alza Plaza in Mountain View, California
- Type: Subsidiary
- Industry: Pharmaceutical and medical systems
- Founded: 1968; 58 years ago
- Founder: Alejandro Zaffaroni
- Number of employees: 10,000
- Parent: Johnson & Johnson

Alza Corporation was an American pharmaceutical and medical systems company.

== Background ==
Founded in 1968 by Dr. Alejandro Zaffaroni; the company's name is a portmanteau of his name. Alza was a major pioneer in the field of drug delivery systems, bringing over 20 prescription pharmaceutical products to market, and employing about 10,000 people during 20 years. In 2001, Alza was acquired by Johnson & Johnson via a stock-for-stock transaction worth US$10.5 billion.

== Drug delivery platforms ==
The company owns the patents on the following delivery platforms:

- Alzamer Depot
- D-Trans
- DUROS implant
- E-Trans electrotransport
- OROS (Osmotic Release Oral System)
- Macroflux transdermal system
- Stealth liposomal

== Marketed Alza products ==
- Catapres-TTS – now marketed by Janssen Pharmaceuticals
- Concerta – now marketed by Janssen Pharmaceuticals
- Covera HS – with G.D. Searle
- Ditropan XL
- Duragesic
- Doxil
- Jurnista / Exalgo
- Glucotrol XL – with Pfizer
- Nicoderm CQ
- Procardia XL – with Pfizer
- Efidac/24 – marketed by CIBA Consumer Pharmaceuticals
- Spirolactone
- Viadur – licensed to Bayer after approval in 2000, but marketing was discontinued in 2008

== Locations ==
Alza built its first corporate headquarters in 1971, at 950 Page Mill Road in Palo Alto, California. In 1990, Alza moved its headquarters to Shoreline Business Park, where it remained until late 2007, a few years after Alza was acquired by Johnson & Johnson. The remaining employees were relocated to two buildings elsewhere in the Shoreline Business Park.

Alza operated a large-scale manufacturing facility in Vacaville, California, but it was announced that this facility would shut down by 2022. They also previously operated a large-scale facility in Cashel, Ireland.

Google's Googleplex is located just east of Alza Plaza. In August–September 2008, Google moved into the Alza plaza buildings.

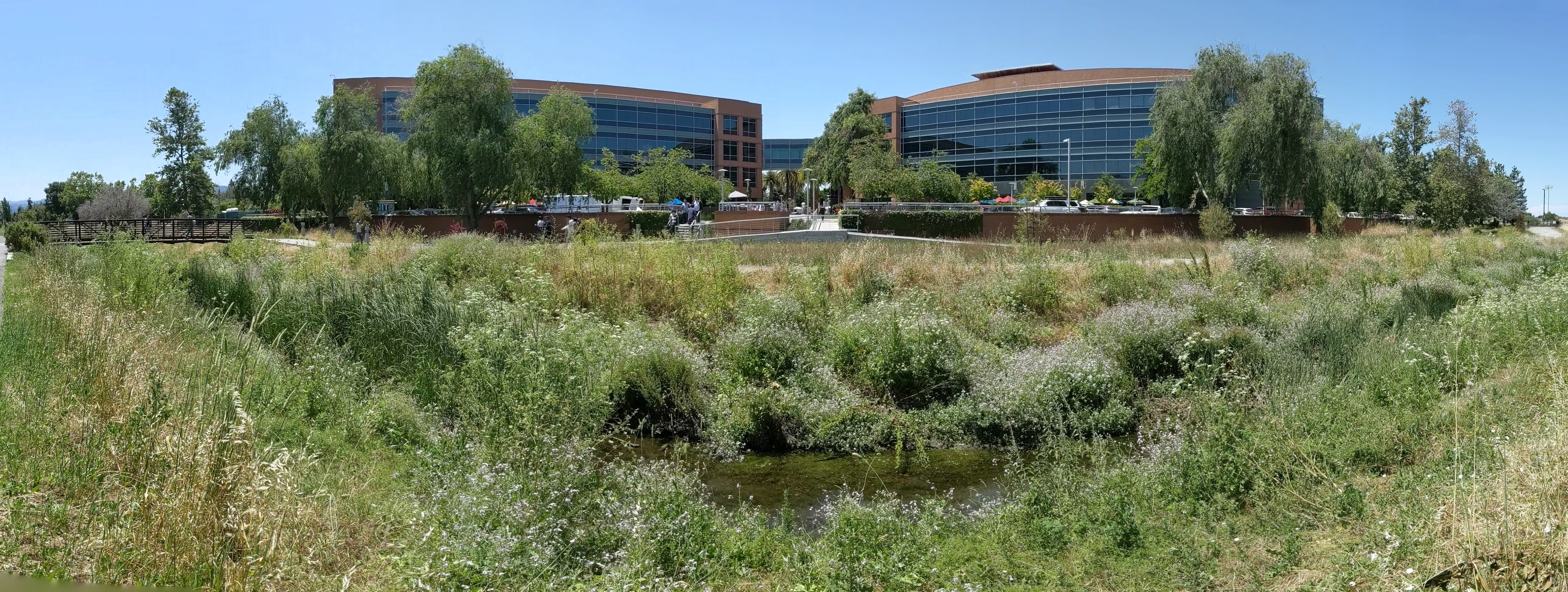
Panoramic view of Alza Plaza from the Permanente Creek Trail, on the east side of Permanente Creek

== See also ==
- Martin Gerstel
- Peter F. Carpenter
- Stephen Stahl
