= Wokai =

- Founded: March 2007
- Founder: Casey Wilson; Courtney McColgan
- Purpose: Economic development
- Location(s): Oakland, California, United States; Beijing, China
- Region served: China
- Method: Microcredit
- Key people: Casey Wilson (chief executive officer)
- Website: www.wokai.org

Wokai was an organization that allowed people to contribute directly to microfinance institutions in China, which in turn lend the money to entrepreneurs in rural China. It was a 501(c)(3) non-profit organization based in Oakland, California, with core operations in Beijing, supported by individual donors, corporate sponsors, fundraising events and grants. As of May 2012, Wokai concluded operations due to funding roadblocks and the need for a new CEO.

== History ==
Wokai was founded in March 2007 by Casey Wilson and Courtney McColgan after they met studying at Tsinghua University in Beijing. Wokai grew to a leadership team of five, a board of directors, and an Investment Committee in addition to numerous volunteers, part of chapters in cities including in Beijing, Boston, Hong Kong, Los Angeles, Nanjing, New York, San Francisco, Seattle, Shanghai, Toronto and Washington, D.C., London, Singapore, Bristol, Dallas and Atlanta. Wokai also maintained a fellowship program called "Wokai Fellows", which allowed selected individuals to work directly with one of Wokai's field partners in rural China.

Wokai's blog featured updates from the field through Wokai Fellows, profiles of Wokai volunteers from around the world, personal glimpses of rural Chinese life, and commentary about current developments in rural China and the microfinance sector.

In May 2012, Wokai announced that it was concluding operations due to a variety of factors.

== Activities ==
Wokai allowed accredited microfinance institutions in China, called "Field Partners", to post profiles of qualified local entrepreneurs on its website. Wokai had two Field Partners, the Association for Rural Development of Yilong County (ARDY), which is based in Sichuan, and Chifeng Zhaowuda Women's Sustainable Development Association (CZWSDA), in Chifeng, Inner Mongolia. Lenders browse and choose an entrepreneur they wish to fund. Wokai aggregates loan capital from individual lenders and transfers it to the appropriate Field Partners to disburse to the entrepreneur chosen by the lender. The average loan is around $300 and is used by low-income entrepreneurs to invest in simple business improvements such as adding additional livestock or buying new products for dry goods stores. As the entrepreneurs repay their loans, the Field Partners remit funds back to Wokai and the lender is alerted of this repayment. Once the loan was repaid, the Wokai lenders could redistribute it to another entrepreneur, up to a total of three loan cycles.

Donors' funds were transferred to Wokai through Google Checkout. Wokai's Field Partners charged interest rates between 15% and 20%. Field Partners used the interest from borrower loans to cover staff salaries, transportation, and operating costs.

== Shutdown ==
As of May 1, 2012, Wokai is no longer in business. The organization sent letters to all the donors and posted a message on its website detailing the reasons for the shutdown. These included funding road blocks and an unmet need for a new CEO.

== See also ==
- Microcredit
- Social entrepreneurship
- Kiva (organization)
- YiNongDai
