= Vittana =

Organization for student loans, 2008–2014

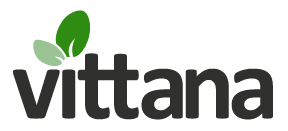
- Founded: 2008
- Founder: Kushal Chakrabarti; Brett Witt
- Defunct: 2014
- Purpose: Education
- Location: Seattle, Washington, United States
- Region served: Worldwide
- Method: Microcredit
- Website: www.vittana.org (formally, now a personal finance blog)

Vittana was a non-governmental organization that allowed people to lend money via the Internet to students in the developing world. It was a 501(c)(3) non-profit organization headquartered in Seattle. Vittana focused on student loans because student loans are nearly unavailable in developing countries.

Vittana ceased operations in 2014.
