= Village Enterprise =

Nonprofit organization in Africa

- Founded: 1987
- Purpose: Economic development
- Location: San Carlos, California, US
- Region served: Africa
- Method: Graduation Approach
- Key people: Sazini Mojapelo (CEO); Bruce Sewell (Chair of the Board of Directors); Brian Lehnen (Co-founder); Joan Hestenes (Co-founder); Dianne Calvi (former CEO, 2010-2026)
- Staff: 400+
- Website: www.villageenterprise.org

Village Enterprise is a 501(c)(3) nonprofit organization that equips the most vulnerable populations living in extreme poverty in rural Africa to launch sustainable businesses and break the cycle of poverty.

As of 2024, Village Enterprise has helped nearly 300,000 people living in extreme poverty in Uganda, Kenya, Rwanda, Ethiopia, the Democratic Republic of the Congo, Congo-Brazzaville, Mozambique, and Tanzania to become entrepreneurs, and 83% of these entrepreneurs are women.

== How it works ==
The Village Enterprise poverty graduation model is a one-year graduation approach that targets households living below the international poverty line and provides: access to a savings group, business training, startup cash, and business mentoring. The startup cash provided is a seed capital grant ranging from US$180 to US$300 given to groups of three entrepreneurs who launch a business together. The positive impacts of the graduation approach and the rigorous evidence that supports it were highlighted by Nicholas Kristof in his 2015 New York Times article “The Power of Hope is Real.”

A randomized controlled trial published in 2022 by IDinsight found the Village Enterprise program had a positive and statistically significant impact on both indicators it measured: monthly consumption and net assets. It also estimated the Village Enterprise program to have a 534% lifetime benefit-cost ratio, meaning for every $1 invested into the program, $5.34 of income is generated by their entrepreneurs. A previous randomized controlled trial by Innovations for Poverty Action that was published in 2018 and written about in Vox found that the Village Enterprise program led to increases in consumption, assets, income, as well as improvements in nutrition and subjective wellbeing of business owners and their families.

== History ==
Village Enterprise was co-founded in 1987 by Brian Lehnen and Joan Hestenes.

Village Enterprise hired its first outside CEO, Dianne Calvi, in 2010. Because of her impact at Village Enterprise, Calvi was honored with the President’s Award for the Advancement of the Common Good from Stanford University in 2023.

In 2017, Village Enterprise launched a Development Impact Bond (DIB), the first for poverty alleviation in sub-Saharan Africa. When the results were released in 2022, the Village Enterprise DIB was shown to have succeeded, despite being implemented during the Covid-19 pandemic. The randomized controlled trial conducted by IDinsight estimated the program would generate lifetime impacts of more than $21 million for communities, around four times the overall cost of the project.
