= Executive Branch (club) =

Washington D.C. private members club

- Founded: April 2025; 1 year ago
- Type: Private club
- Headquarters: Georgetown, Washington, D.C.
- Coordinates: 38°54′16.60″N 77°3′46.76″W
- Owners: Chris Buskirk; Omeed Malik; Donald Trump Jr.; Alex Witkoff; Zach Witkoff
- President: Glenn Gilmore
- Affiliations: Republican; Make America Great Again
- Website: www.executivebranch.com

The Executive Branch is a private members club that opened in the Georgetown neighborhood of Washington, D.C. in 2025. It has been described as a "private club for the MAGA elite".

== History and background ==
The Executive Branch was first announced in April 2025. The launch party was held on April 26 at the Willard Hotel, following the White House Correspondents' dinner. It was attended by members of the Trump administration, including Cora Alvi, Paul Atkins, James Blair, Pam Bondi, Dan Bongino, Taylor Budowich, Brendan Carr, Andrew Ferguson, Jeff Freeland, Tulsi Gabbard, Karoline Leavitt, Tricia McLaughlin, Mehmet Oz, Alexandra Preate, Marco Rubio, and Stefanie Spear. Other attendees included "wealthy CEOs, tech founders and policy experts" such as Pace Bradshaw, Adam Foroughi, Shawn O'Neail, Garrett Ventry, and Alexa Henning. Despite the club's strict "no media" rule, the launch party included members of the media, many of whom were, or would go on to become, future White House Correspondents: Dasha Burns (Politico), Garrett Haake (NBC and MSNBC), Kristen Holmes (CNN), Laura Ingraham (Fox News), Alayna Treene (CNN), and Melanie Zanoma (NBC). Donald Trump was not in attendance, as he was out of the country to attend the funeral of Pope Francis.

The club opened as part of a trend of exclusive clubs in cities across the United States in the years following the COVID-19 pandemic. It also opened within the first year of Donald Trump's second presidency, and during shifts in the ways that the White House press corps and other members of the media interact with Trump and various politicians.

In January 2026, Executive Branch hosted an afterparty, including a performance by Akon, for the premiere of Melania.

Nelly performed at the club in April 2026, the night before that year's White House Correspondents Dinner. Attendants of this party included Lisa and Mehmet Oz, Harmeet Dhillon, Alexi Lalas, Clay Travis, Dahntay Jones, Michael Selig, Abraham Hamadeh, Chris Klomp, Nate Morris, Joe Kernen, Tony Tata, Todd Blanche, and Alayna Treene, among others.

== Membership and purpose ==
The owners of the club are Donald Trump Jr. (son of Donald Trump), Omeed Malik and Chris Buskirk of 1789 Capital, and businessmen Alex Witkoff and Zach Witkoff (sons of Steve Witkoff, real estate developer and US envoy to the Middle East). The club president is Glenn Gilmore, according to Mother Jones. Former Metropolitan Police Department officer Sean LoJacono is also involved in controlling the company.

Founding members include crypto czar David O. Sacks, investor Chamath Palihapitiya, the Winklevoss twins, and superlobbyist Jeff Miller.

The membership fee for "founding members" is $500,000, with additional annual dues. According to David Sacks, there are also lower level memberships that are "more reasonable". Membership requires referral by existing members and approval and vetting by the club, and The New York Times reported a spokesperson for the club informed them that "you have to know the owners" to get in. Axios reported that members are "tightly screened for loyalty to President Trump". CNBC quoted a "person close to the club" as saying that they did not want " ... members of the media or just a lot of lobbyists joining ... We want people to feel comfortable having conversations in privacy".

On his podcast, All-In, David Sacks declared that every member of the media–including conservative media–are banned from the club, and said the list of accepted members is "unlikely to include traditional Republicans who frequent decades-old Washington clubs", including "Bush-era Republicans". He also said,

We wanted a place to hang out and the clubs that exist in Washington today have been around for decades. They're kind of old and stuffy.... So we wanted to create something, new hipper, and Trump aligned. We want a place to go where you don't have to worry that the next person over at the bar is a fake news reporter or even a lobbyist.

Omeed Malik told Realtor.com that "During the 2024 campaign, many of us developed deep friendships and wanted to be able to catch up when our paths crossed in D.C. [...] There aren't a plethora of options that are friendly to Republicans—examples of that abound—and we needed a space where friends can converse without worrying about their conversations showing up in the press the next day."

According to former staff of the club, about 50 people had been admitted as of December 2025.

== Description ==
The club is located off Wisconsin Avenue behind the Georgetown Park mall in the Georgetown neighborhood of Washington, D.C., in an unmarked basement that was formerly home to a billiards bar called Clubhouse. The street entrance is relatively undistinguished, and for VIP members, there is another entrance through an underground parking garage. There are condos in the same building, above the club.

Omeed Malik has said that the club's founders wanted "a high-end experience comparable to the finest social clubs in the world". According to the Washington Post, the décor is "intended to evoke the elegance of a grand mansion." The decor has been described as "modern" and taking inspiration from Aman New York. The Daily Beast reported that the founders have brought "about $10 million worth of art" into the club, "including original oil paintings and bronze sculptures".

The menu, according to Realtor.com, is "health-conscious" with "'nods'" to Robert F. Kennedy Jr.'s Make America Healthy Again initiative, and includes American, Mediterranean, and Japanese-inspired dishes, as well as "cocktails and high-end wines".

== Reception ==
Some have expressed concerns over the club's secrecy and ties to the second Trump Administration. For example, Diana Kendall, emeritus professor of psychology at Baylor University, said the club enables Donald Trump to "go behind the curtain" so that the public does not know who he is meeting with, "particularly business and tech moguls, who really want access to the power of the throne."

John Pelissero of the Markkula Center for Applied Ethics at Santa Clara University said that the club "just appears to be a ploy to sell access to Trump and the Trump administration through this private club for wealthy donors." Pelissero has also said,

No government official should be assisting a business associate in their financial interest. It is unfair and there is a lack of transparency when people are interacting with Trump administration officials in an expensive private club that other people cannot access."

Eric Lipton of the New York Times told CNN the club is "effectively a Mar-a-Lago in D.C.", referring to the controversial way that Trump has used his home and resort at Mar-A-Lago to meet with politicians and businesspeople in private.

Democratic senator Adam Schiff said that the club is a place "for insiders, for investors and billionaires to directly line the pockets of the first family, sending a message as clear as day to anyone who wants to do business in the United States: If you want to be with Trump, you've got to pay the cover charge." Malik responded to this by saying Schiff's claims were "ridiculous" and asking, "Where are all the media stories accusing clubs designed for Democrats of peddling influence?"

Democratic House representative Marcy Kaptur decried the luxury of the club, saying,

This Executive Branch club isn't just an insult to the working class. It's a vivid, grotesque portrait of ruling billionaires focused on totally enriching themselves and neglecting our nation. [...] This excess reminds me of the disgusting behavior of the emperor Nero, who rightly has been relegated to the dustbin of history.

The club has drawn comparisons to the former Trump International Hotel in Washington, D.C., where Donald Trump conducted meetings with business executives and foreign officials from 2017 to 2022. People said Trump was "expected" to appear at the Executive Branch from time to time. The Trump International Hotel and events surrounding it were controversial over the course of Trump's first presidency and the topic was a subject of investigation by the House Oversight Committee during the 2019 impeachment inquiry. A reporter for The Independent said the venue was "discreet and guarded" compared to the Trump International Hotel, and that as a result, any visits there "would potentially be shrouded in mystery and rife with speculation."

== See also ==
- Dialog (organization)
- Drain the swamp
- List of gentlemen's clubs in the United States
- Political club
- Rockbridge Network
- Zero Bond
