= Witkoff (surname) =

Witkoff is a surname. Notable people with the surname include:

- Alex Witkoff, American businessman who co-founded, with his brother, a cryptocurrency firm
- Steve Witkoff, American real estate developer and father of Alex and Zach Witkoff
- Zach Witkoff, American businessman who co-founded, with his brother, a cryptocurrency firm
