= Klomp (surname) =

Klomp is a Dutch surname. In most cases it is a metonymic occupational surname, originally referring to a klomp maker. Variant (plural) forms of the surname are Klompe and Klompen. To make this surname of humble origin more distinct, some families added an accent (Klompé), as if the name had a French origin. People with this name include:

- Albert Jansz. Klomp (1625–1688), Dutch landscape and animal painter
- Bart Klomp (born 1999), Dutch curler
- Birgit Klomp (born 1940), German freestyle swimmer
- Carmen Klomp-Wearne (born 1975), Australian rower
- Chris Klomp (born 1980), American businessman
- Daan Klomp (born 1998), Dutch football defender
- Johannes Franziskus Klomp (1865–1946), Dutch-born German architect
- Nick Klomp, Australian academic administrator
- René Klomp (born 1974), Dutch football midfielder
- Robbert Klomp (born 1955), Australian rules football player

Klompe / Klompé

- Marga Klompé (1912–1986), Dutch KVP politician; government minister from 1956 to 1971
- Tieme Klompe (born 1976), Dutch football defender
- Theodorus Klompe (1903–1963), Dutch geologist in South East Asia

== See also ==
- De Klomp, neighborhood of Ede, Netherlands
