= Alex Witkoff =

American businessman

- Born: c. 1992 (age 33–34); United States
- Education: University of Pennsylvania (BS)
- Occupation: Businessman
- Relatives: Steve Witkoff (father); Zach Witkoff (brother)

Alexander "Alex" Witkoff is an American businessman who is the son of billionaire businessman Steve Witkoff. He is the CEO of the Witkoff Group, a private real estate development and investment group founded by his father. Along with his brother Zach, he is a co-founder of World Liberty Financial, a cryptocurrency firm.

Witkoff has stirred controversy for soliciting billions of dollars in investment from governments in the Middle-East at the same time that his father was engaged in negotiations with those governments as the Donald Trump administration’s envoy to the Middle East. Witkoff is also a co-founder of the cryptocurrency firm World Liberty Financial, which has been involved in multiple conflicts of interest controversies in relation to the Trump family.

== Early life and education ==
Witkoff grew up in New York City. His father is Steve Witkoff, and Zach Witkoff is his brother. The two had a brother named Andrew who died from an opioid overdose in 2011.

He received his Bachelor's of Science in Economics at the Wharton School of Economics, University of Pennsylvania.

== Career ==
Witkoff previously served as co-CEO of the Witkoff Group with his father. Following his father's appointment as special envoy in 2025, Alex has taken over running the firm.

Witkoff has led several projects for the Witkoff Group, including the redevelopment of the historic Shore Club in Miami Beach, and the firm’s completion of One High Line in Manhattan. He has been involved in the Ocean Terrace redevelopment in North Beach and in Shell Bay, a private golf-club and resort community in Hallandale Beach.

Witkoff is a trustee at the Institute of Contemporary Art in Miami. He is also on the board of United Hatzalah.

In May 2025, Trump appointed Witkoff to the U.S. Holocaust Memorial Council.

Along with his brother Zach, he is a co-founder of World Liberty Financial, a cryptocurrency firm closely linked to the Trump family. The firm has been criticized for its ability to benefit the president personally. On September 1, 2025, World Liberty Financial began allowing customers to begin trading its cryptocurrency token, and has since added US $670 million to the Trump family's net worth.

Alongside Zach, Donald Trump Jr., Omeed Malik, and Chris Buskirk of 1789 Capital, Witkoff is the co-owner of the Executive Branch, an invitation only private member's club in the Georgetown neighborhood of Washington, D.C. founded in April 2025. The club's inaugural dinner was held on September 3, 2025.

== Personal life ==
Witkoff is the son of Steve Witkoff, a real estate investor and the first United States Special Envoy to the Middle East.

Witkoff is described as a "family friend" of the Trump family and attended the 2024 victory party for Donald Trump's re-election at the Palm Beach Convention Center.

== See also ==
- Cryptocurrency in the second Trump presidency
