= World Liberty Trust Company =

- Headquarters: Bay Harbor Islands, Florida
- Key people: Zach Witkoff (president and chairman)
- Parent: World Liberty Financial

World Liberty Trust Company is a federally chartered American national trust bank connected to World Liberty Financial (WLFI).

The bank is based in headquartered in Bay Harbor Islands, Florida.

== History ==
In January 2026, World Liberty Trust Company applied for a national banking license in the U.S. Per The Wall Street Journal, the license "would allow World Liberty Trust to issue and safeguard USD1."

In August 2026, the World Liberty Trust Company's bank charter application was conditionally approved by the Office of the Comptroller of the Currency (OCC). The charter would allow the World Liberty Trust Company bank to hold and manage assets on behalf of customers.

On August 27, 2026, The Wall Street Journal reported that Emirati Sheikh Tahnoon bin Zayed al Nahyan and co-investors held the largest stake in World Liberty Trust Company.
