= Trump International Hotel Maldives =

Proposed hotel

The Trump International Hotel Maldives is a proposed hotel to be built by the Trump Organization with the Saudi Arabian real estate developer Dar Global in the Maldives. It was described as the "world's first tokenized hotel development" upon its launch in November 2025. Writing for The Hill, Julia Shapero described the hotel as "merging the Trump family’s newfound interest in cryptocurrency with its long-standing real estate business" in reference to the popularity of cryptocurrency in the second Trump presidency.

Eric Trump described the project as one that would "not only redefine luxury in the region but also set a new benchmark for innovation in real estate investment through tokenization".
