= World Liberty Financial =

Decentralized finance protocol

Denominations
- Symbol: WLFI
- Code: WLFI

Development
- White paper: White paper
- Initial release: September 16, 2024; 2 years ago
- Latest release: September 1, 2025; 14 months ago
- Development status: Active
- Written in: Solidity (Ethereum), Rust (Solana)
- Operating system: Cross-platform
- Developer: World Liberty Financial Inc.

Ledger
- Block explorer: Etherscan
- Circulating supply: 24.67 billion WLFI (Sept 2025)
- Supply limit: 100 billion WLFI

Website
- Website: worldlibertyfinancial.com

The market price of World Liberty's WLFI token has declined since becoming publicly traded, though a Trump business entity collected a 75% cut of WLFI sales despite its decline. Donald Trump's 2025 profits reached $799 million.

World Liberty Financial (WLFI) is a decentralized finance protocol developed by its namesake company. It was founded in 2024 by Zachary Folkman, Chase Herro, Alex Witkoff, Zach Witkoff, and Trump family members. It is a business venture of the Trump family. The Trump family receives 75% of net proceeds when WLFI sells tokens, as well as gets a cut of stablecoin profits. By December 2025, the Trumps had profited $1 billion on proceeds, while holding $3 billion worth of unsold tokens.

The company has been subject of extensive reporting on conflict of interest stemming from Donald Trump's involvement, including secret deals with foreign entities and businesspeople who had previously been under criminal investigation or convicted. One of World Liberty's few publicly known investors is crypto billionaire Justin Sun; shortly after Trump took office in 2025, Sun invested $30 million into World Liberty and an SEC investigation into him was subsequently dropped. Also, Binance had helped enrich World Liberty Financial.

In 2025, a firm associated with the Abu Dhabi government purchased $2 billion worth of USD1 stablecoins from World Liberty and secretly bought a 49% stake in the company for half a billion dollars; shortly thereafter, the Trump administration approved a plan to give the UAE firm hundreds of thousands of advanced, scarce computer chips, despite national security concerns. Legal experts have described the UAE deal as a potential violation of the emoluments clause of the U.S. Constitution.

== History ==
In September 2024, Trump announced that his sons would enter the cryptocurrency marketplace with a new venture called World Liberty Financial. In October, it announced its first initiative marketing a cryptocurrency called $WLFI. By the end of October 2024, the company had only sold $2.7 million worth of $WLFI, which abruptly changed and soared following Trump's victory in the 2024 United States presidential election.

Four days before Trump's second inauguration in January 2025, representatives of Tahnoun bin Zayed Al Nahyan signed an agreement to buy a 49% stake in World Liberty Financial for $500 million, through an entity called Aryam Investment 1. The agreement was signed by Eric Trump. Of the first $250 million instalment, $187 million was directed to the Trump family entities DT Marks DEFI LLC and DT Marks SC LLC; at least $31 million was slated for entities affiliated with the family of Steve Witkoff, who weeks earlier had been named U.S. envoy to the Middle East, and a further $31 million to an entity tied to co-founders Zak Folkman and Chase Herro. The deal made Aryam the company's largest shareholder and placed two of its executives, who also held senior positions at Tahnoun's artificial intelligence firm G42, on World Liberty's five-person board, which then included Eric Trump and Zach Witkoff. The Wall Street Journal, which disclosed the deal in February 2026, wrote that it was unprecedented in American politics for a foreign government official to take a major ownership stake in an incoming U.S. president's company. A World Liberty spokesman said the company operated "by the same rules and regulations as any other company in our space" and that neither Trump nor Steve Witkoff had been involved in the deal; a White House spokeswoman said there were "no conflicts of interest".

In 2025, Justin Sun acquired $WLFI tokens, reportedly for at least $75 million. Sun was also named a World Liberty Financial advisor. In February 2025, shortly after Trump took office as president for the second time, the Securities and Exchange Commission was reported to be backing off an investigation that it was conducting into Sun's companies. The financial relationship between Trump and Sun raised potential conflicts of interest at that time.

In March 2025, World Liberty announced it would launch USD1, a dollar-pegged stablecoin backed by U.S. treasuries, dollars, and other cash equivalents. Steve Witkoff later announced that stablecoin USD1 would be integrated into Tron, Sun's blockchain.

In May 2025, MGX, an Abu Dhabi-state backed company led by Tahnoun bin Zayed Al Nahyan of the Abu Dhabi royal family and National Security Advisor of United Arab Emirates, announced it would use $2 billion worth of the USD1 stablecoin launched by World Liberty to finance a deal in crypto exchange Binance. The deal was criticized by government ethics experts over potential conflicts of interest. Reuters reported that an anonymous cryptocurrency wallet holding approximately $2 billion worth of World Liberty Financial’s USD1 stablecoin received the funds between April 16 and 29, though the owner of the wallet could not be identified. Reuters also reported that Zach Witkoff and two other World Liberty co-founders met with Binance founder and former CEO Changpeng Zhao in Abu Dhabi. Shortly after Sheik Tahnoun put money into the World Liberty Financial, the Trump administration approved a plan to allow one of Tahnoun's companies to receive hundreds of thousands of the world’s most advanced and scarce computer chips, despite national security concerns that the chips would end up in China.

Later that month, Pakistan signed an agreement with SC Financial Technologies, a company affiliated with WLF to explore using WLF’s USD1 stablecoin for cross-border payments. The partnership aimed to integrate the stablecoin into Pakistan's regulated digital payment system. This deal marked one of the first public collaborations between WLF and a sovereign nation.

At the end of January 2026, it was reported that days before Trump's inauguration Tahnoun bin Zayed Al Nahyan interests had agreed to buy 49% of WLFI for half a billion dollars. WLF did not disclose that Tahnoun had purchased the 49% share. WLF also did not disclose to the public that two Tahnoun affiliates, Martin Edelman (general counsel of Tahnouun's company G42) and Peng Xiao (CEO of G42), had been put on the board of WLF.

In January 2026, the Pakistani government signed an agreement with WLF to incorporate cryptocurrency into Pakistan's financial system. Zach Witkoff negotiated the agreement with Muhammad Aurangzeb, the Pakistani finance minister. A month later, Steve Witkoff negotiated an unusual deal with Aurangzeb whereby the American and Pakistani governments would explore the redevelopment of the Roosevelt Hotel in Manhattan, which the Pakistan government owns.

In March 2026, the Seychelles-based cryptocurrency company KuCoin received a favorable settlement case with the CFTC under the second Trump administration. Before it received the favorable settlement in the case which was originally pursued by the CFTC under the Joe Biden administration, KuCoin entered into a partnership with WLF.

In March 2026, World Liberty Financial offered "guaranteed direct access" to members of its business development team and other executives in exchange for investors holding $5 million worth of the $WLFI token for a six-month period.

In April 2026, Forbes reported that Steve Witkoff had substantially enriched himself during his tenure in the second Donald Trump administration, in large part due to his investments in WLF.

In April 2026, Justin Sun filed a lawsuit against World Liberty Financial over alleged extortion. He claimed that he had been denied the voting rights he had been promised for the WLFI token and that, on top of that, wallets had been frozen.

In July 2026, a spokesman for World Liberty blamed the sharply lower value of $WLFI on broader market conditions, citing the lower prices of Bitcoin and other cryptocurrencies.

== World Liberty Trust Company ==
In July 2025, Trump signed the GENIUS Act, which allows approved stablecoin issuers to hold directly the reserve assets backing their coins. World Liberty subsequently applied for a federal bank charter, and in August 2026 the Office of the Comptroller of the Currency (OCC) granted preliminary conditional approval for it to establish a national trust bank to issue, redeem and safeguard USD1, which by then had a market value of about $4 billion. The Wall Street Journal reported that Tahnoun bin Zayed Al Nahyan and co-investors held the largest stake, 49%, in the bank's holding company, WLTC Holdings, through an entity called StringZ Holding RSC, while an entity affiliated with the Trump family held 38%; Zach Witkoff chaired the holding company's board. The OCC required three shareholders, including StringZ and the Trump-affiliated entity, to give passivity commitments undertaking not to seek to influence the bank's management, a condition the agency had imposed only once before since 2025. An OCC official said the application had been reviewed by career staff who consulted government ethics officials.

In January 2026, World Liberty Trust Company, a trust company owned by WLF and with Zach Witkoff as its president and chairman, applied for a national banking license in the U.S. Per The Wall Street Journal, the license "would allow World Liberty Trust to issue and safeguard USD1."

Senator Elizabeth Warren questioned the Comptroller of the Currency, Jonathan Gould, about Tahnoun's role at a February 2026 Senate Banking Committee hearing; the OCC declined to provide the non-public portion of the application to the committee. In a subsequent letter Warren said any financial connection between Tahnoun and an applicant for a national bank charter should be disqualifying on national security grounds, and 40 Democratic lawmakers wrote to Treasury Secretary Scott Bessent raising concerns about foreign ownership and the integrity of the bank-chartering process. A White House spokeswoman said Trump "only acts in the best interest of the American public" and denied any conflicts of interest.

The Wall Street Journal reported, in August 2026, that World Liberty Financial was preparing for the launch of its new federally-chartered national trust bank.

== USD1 ==
USD1 is a stablecoin issued by World Liberty Financial. It was launched in March 2025.

In June 2025, World Liberty Financial formed a joint initiative with PancakeSwap, a decentralized finance protocol operated by Binance, to promote its stablecoin, USD1. Hundreds of patriotic-sounding memecoins, such as Torch of Liberty and Eagles Landing, were created by users of Chinese origin to promote USD1. PancakeSwap also started a "Liquidity Drive" program, offering prizes of up to $1 million to increase trading of USD1 on its platform.

As of 2025, USD1 has a circulation supply of $2 billion and most of it is held by Binance, which allows World Liberty Financial to earn around $80 million per year by investing in government bonds and money market funds.

In June 2026, World Liberty Financial compensated UFC fighters who were awarded bonuses on the UFC Freedom 250 card, an event that took place on the White House lawn during President Trump's birthday, by paying them out in USD1.

== Ownership ==
The company has been noted for its close connections to Donald Trump. A Trump business entity owns 60 percent of World Liberty, and is entitled to 75 percent of all revenue from coin sales. Eric Trump and Donald Trump Jr. are actively involved in the management of the company, and rely on three partners, Zachary Folkman, Chase Herro, and Zach Witkoff, to maintain daily operations. The Trump family and its affiliates were given 22.5 billion units of World Liberty's coins, $WLFI; the company says those who buy $WLFI will be able to vote on certain decisions like shareholders in a traditional company.

UAE Royal Family owns a 49 percent stake, a deal signed prior to Trump’s second inauguration (Reported in a February 2026 New York Times article).

According to an analysis by The New Yorker in August 2025, the Trump family had gained $412.5 million from the venture.

== Management ==
Donald Trump's company title is "chief crypto advocate", his 20-year-old son Barron Trump is listed as the project's "DeFi (decentralized finance) visionary", Ogle from Glue is listed as a key advisor, and Eric Trump and Donald Trump Jr. each have the title "Web3 ambassador." Steve Witkoff's sons, Alex and Zach Witkoff, are co-founders of the company. WLFI has been marketed as a portal for traders to invest in cryptocurrency and use those cryptocurrency assets for both borrowing and lending.

== See also ==
- American Bitcoin
