= PancakeSwap =

Decentralized cryptocurrency exchange

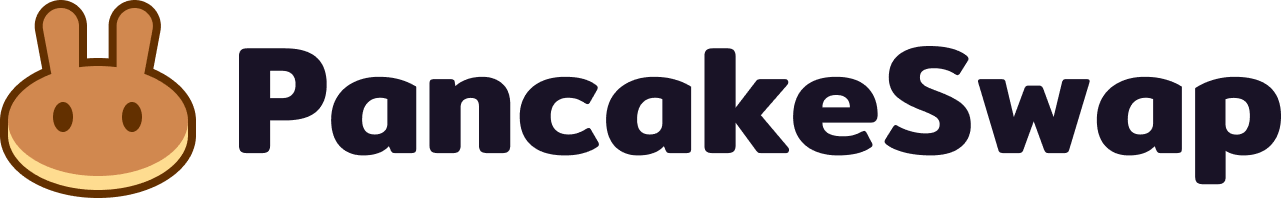

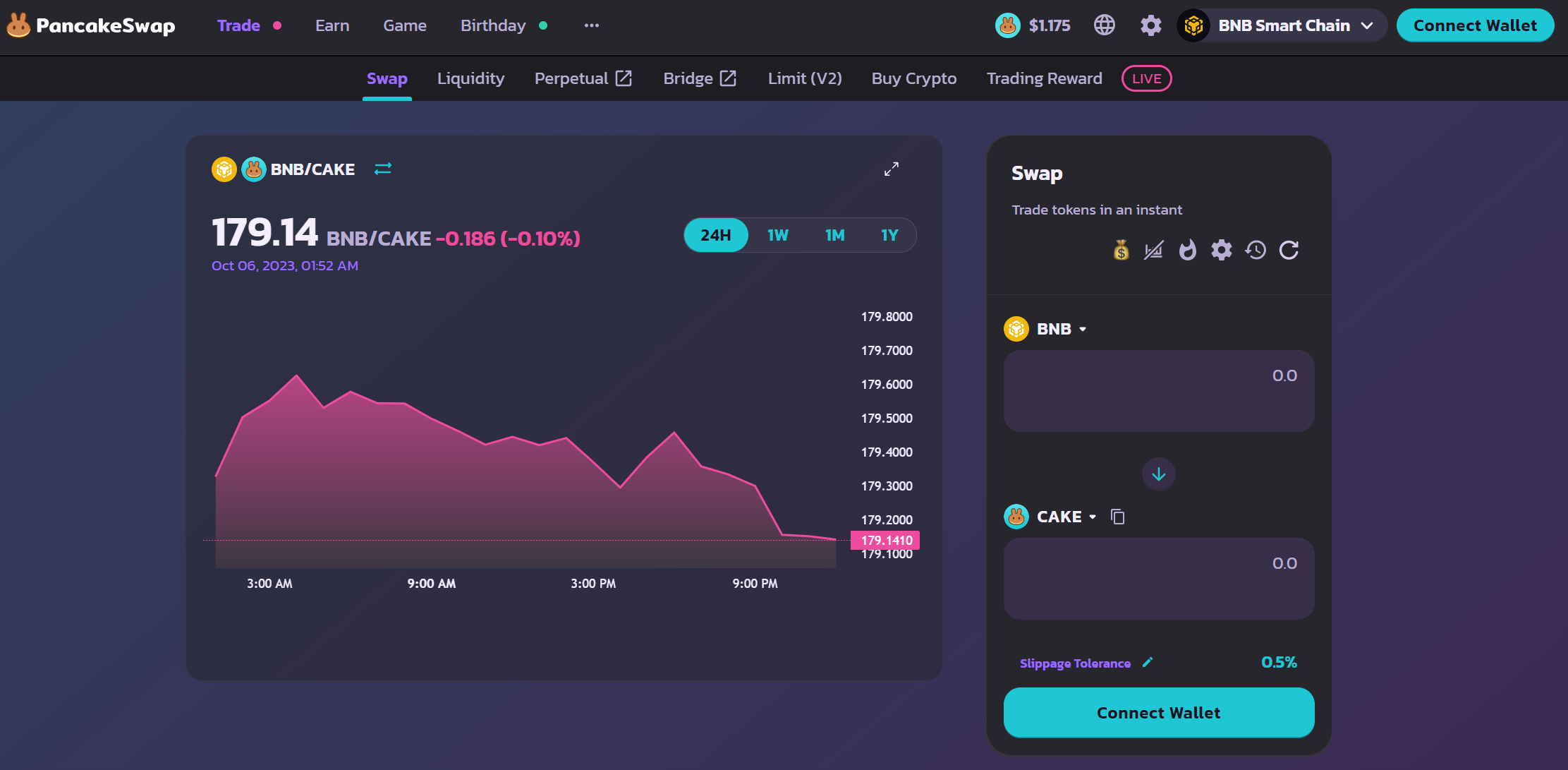
- PancakeSwap's web application interface
- Written in: Solidity
- Platform: Binance Smart Chain; Ethereum
- Type: Decentralized exchange
- License: GNU General Public License v3.0
- Website: pancakeswap.finance
- Repository: github.com/pancakeswap

PancakeSwap is a decentralized exchange (DEX) built on multiple blockchains. It is administered by Binance.

As of 2024, it is one of the major DEX on Binance Smart Chain and has more than $2.3B in total value locked.

== History ==
PancakeSwap was founded in 2020 by anonymous developers. Its domain was registered in Shanghai, China. According to former Binance employees, it was created by Binance staff as an extension of its centralized exchange.

In June 2025, PancakeSwap formed a joint initiative with World Liberty Financial, a decentralized finance protocol founded by Trump family, to promote its stablecoin, USD1. Hundreds of patriotic-sounding memecoins, such as Torch of Liberty and Eagles Landing, were created by users of Chinese origin to promote USD1. PancakeSwap also started a "Liquidity Drive" program, offering prizes of up to $1 million to increase trading of USD1 on its platform.

== Protocol ==
PancakeSwap is a decentralized finance protocol that is used to exchange cryptocurrencies and tokens; it is provided on blockchain networks that run open-source software. It uses an automated market maker (AMM) model for trading BEP-20 tokens.

The native token of protocol is CAKE which is used for governance and to incentivize liquidity provision. CAKE token holders can participate in governance by voting on proposals that influence the platform's development.

== See also ==
- Uniswap
