= HFZ Capital Group =

American investment company

- Type: Private
- Industry: Real estate
- Founded: 2005
- Founder: Ziel Feldman
- Headquarters: New York City, U.S.
- Key people: Ziel Feldman (chairman)
- Website: hfzcap.com

HFZ Capital Group is a real estate development and investment company based in New York City. Ziel Feldman founded HFZ in 2005 and is chairman. As of 2019, HFZ managed more than $10 billion worth of development.

== History ==
Prior to launching HFZ in 2005, Feldman was principal at the national development firm Property Markets Group (PMG), which he co-founded with Kevin Maloney in 1991. At PMG, Feldman also worked with Gary Barnett of Extell Development Company.

In 2013, HFZ and partner Fortress Investment Group purchased four Manhattan rental buildings, including The Astor, from Westbrook Partners for more than $610 million. HFZ then converted the properties into for-sale condominiums.

In March 2015, HFZ acquired The Belnord on the Upper West Side of Manhattan from Extell for about $575 million. HFZ hired architect Robert A. M. Stern for the renovation and conversion of the pre-war building into a condominium.

In May 2015, HFZ acquired a full-block site in Chelsea, Manhattan between 17th and 18th Street, and 10th and 11th Avenue for $870 million from Edison Properties. HFZ began the development of the property into a two-tower mixed-use development called The XI. Designed by architect Bjarke Ingels, The XI planned for 236 condos and Six Senses' first hotel in the U.S.

In 2021, The XI went into foreclosure before completion, and opened with different owners. In 2021, the company also lost four condos in Manhattan. The firm subsequently collapsed amid "an avalanche of investor lawsuits and foreclosures." In February, 2024, a former executive was arrested for criminal activities.
