= Martin Edelman =

Real estate lawyer

Martin Edelman is a real estate lawyer who serves as advisor to the ruling royal UAE family. He is a close advisor to UAE royal Tahnoun bin Zayed Al Nahyan. He works for the law firm Paul Hastings.

== Early life ==
He was raised in a Jewish family in Westchester County, New York. His father was a Russian immigrant to the United States. Edelman studied at Princeton University in the 1960s. He studied at Columbia Law School. He was drafted and served multiple tours in the Vietnam War over a three-year period.

== Career ==
Upon returning to New York, Edelman became a high-profile lawyer in real estate.

Edelman has since 2002 cultivated relationships in the UAE. Reflecting on his ties to the UAE government, Edelman has said: "That dramatically changed my life. I’ve gotten to do everything I ever thought I wanted to do and then 4,000 things that I never thought about before."

Edelman played a key role in a secret 2025 deal where Tahnoun's company G42 purchased a 49% stake in World Liberty Financial, a Trump family business, with the Trump administration subsequently overriding national security concerns to approve the sale of advanced AI chips to the UAE.

Edelman is general counsel to G42 and an advisor to the Royal Group, two companies owned by Tahnoun bin Zayed Al Nahyan. He is a board member of Manchester City and helped the Abu Dhabi government buy the club in 2008.

Edelman was named by the Donald Trump administration as a member on the executive board to oversee Gaza.
