= Cryptocurrency in the second Trump presidency =

During the second presidency of Donald Trump, cryptocurrency was promoted by Trump and his administration, which took a series of crypto-friendly actions and decisions. His administration appointed crypto-friendly regulators, reduced crypto regulation and dropped investigations into crypto firms and crypto crime. Trump promoted his own cryptocurrency meme coin, $Trump, and maintained significant investments in crypto with his family company World Liberty Financial, all of which raised significant conflict of interest concerns. His campaign and inauguration received millions of dollars in donations from the crypto industry. For this, he called himself the "crypto president".

== Background ==
In American president Donald Trump's first term, he had opposed cryptocurrency, calling it "not money" and "based on thin air". He had told Fox Business in 2021 that Bitcoin "seems like a scam" to compete with the U.S. dollar. In his second presidency, Trump campaigned for digital assets.

=== Nominations ===
Trump nominated Paul S. Atkins, who has "close ties to the crypto industry" according to the New York Times, to succeed Gary Gensler as chair of SEC.

=== Industry political donations ===
In the 2024 election, the cryptocurrency industry became the largest corporate donor, with $238 million—more than the oil, gas, and pharmaceutical lobbies. The crypto industry gave $18 million to the Trump inauguration, money that Trump was free to spend as he wished.

In May 2025, The Economist described cryptocurrency's embrace of Trump as "turning it into something of a partisan cause" and derailing a bipartisan regulatory framework for stablecoins. Senators had concerns over Trump's conflicts of interest and influence-peddling with cryptocurrency companies.

== Policy actions ==
=== Decreased regulation ===
In February 2025, and in a sharp reversal of policy, the Security and Exchange Commission (SEC) under Trump announced a new Crypto Task Force to handle regulation as it dropped lawsuits or dismissed charges against Justin Sun, Coinbase, Kraken, Consensys, Robinhood, OpenSea, Cumberland, and settled with Ripple. Paul S. Atkins became SEC chair to oversee the identification and repeal of regulations prohibited in Trump's February 19 executive order.

In April 2025, Trump disbanded the Justice Department agency responsible for regulating cryptocurrency crime. In a memo, deputy attorney general Todd Blanche said the national cryptocurrency enforcement team (established in February 2022 to "address the challenge posed by the criminal misuse of cryptocurrencies and digital assets") "shall be disbanded effective immediately" as "the Department of Justice is not a digital assets regulator".

Trump pardoned BitMEX—the first presidential pardon of a corporation.

The Securities and Exchange Commission (SEC) under Trump filed to dismiss its lawsuit against Coinbase which had charged Coinbase was "Operating as an Unregistered Securities Exchange, Broker, and Clearing Agency". The SEC requested a 60-day pause in its lawsuit against Binance that alleged mishandling of funds and securities law violations. The SEC asked that the case against Trump associate and crypto billionaire Justin Sun be put on hold. The SEC said it would not exercise any regulatory authority over memecoins.

=== Legislation ===
In July 2025, Trump signed the GENIUS Act into law.

=== U.S. stockpile ===
In January by executive order, Trump created a Working Group on digital assets and promised to make the U.S. the “crypto capital of the planet.” On March 2 following a crypto sell-off, Trump started a $300 billion global rally in cryptocurrency when he named five types on Truth Social that the US stockpile would hold: Ripple (XRP), Solana (SOL) and Cardano (ADA); and later Bitcoin (BTC) and Ethereum (ETH). On March 6 by executive order, Trump established the strategic bitcoin reserve and the U.S. digital asset stockpile. As Bloomberg said, the strategic Bitcoin reserve cemented Bitcoin as a financial instrument and a U.S. asset held in reserve like gold, oil and cheese.

He held a Crypto Summit at the White House the following day, inviting leaders in the field to discuss the government-owned crypto stockpile. The industry was disappointed that taxpayer funds would not be used to purchase crypto, and the market dropped sharply following the order.

== House Judiciary Committee report ==
On November 25, 2025, U.S. Representative Jamie Raskin released a report finding that following an investigation by Democrats on the U.S. House Judiciary Committee, it was determined that the cryptocurrency policies of Trump were in fact used to benefit Trump and his family, with Trump in fact adding billions of dollars to his net worth through cryptocurrency schemes which were entangled with foreign governments, corporate allies, and criminal actors. The report, title Trump, Crypto, and a New Age of Corruption, also found that Trump dismantled anti-corruption safeguards and pardoned people who were regarded as "corporate cronies" in order to build his cryptocurrency empire.

== Conflicts of interest ==
Most of Donald Trump's 2025 revenue was derived from his businesses' cryptocurrency ventures, an industry over which he wielded substantial regulatory power.

Trump's ties to cryptocurrency have led to concerns of corruption, with Senator Elizabeth Warren describing Trump as "enriching himself and his family through their crypto businesses while his administration guts oversight of the market". Representative Ayanna Pressley criticized the Trump administration and the Department of Government Efficiency's targeting of the Consumer Financial Protection Bureau and "emphasized the critical role" of the agency's work to protect consumers of cryptocurrencies. ProPublica reported that the Department of Housing and Urban Development had discussed using cryptocurrency, which was described as "simply reckless" by Representatives Maxine Waters, Stephen Lynch and Emanuel Cleaver, who drew comparisons with "risky, unregulated, and predatory financial products" that led to the Great Recession.

As of May 2025, the Trump family owns four cryptocurrency ventures. His eldest sons Eric and Donald Jr. founded a Bitcoin mining firm American Bitcoin Corp, a merger with American Data Centers in 2025. Donald Trump's assets are held in trust and managed by his children while he serves as U.S. president.

=== Trump Media and Technology Group (TMTG) ===
TMTG, the parent company of Truth Social, diversified into a financial technology company in January, and announced in May that it would sell shares and bonds to raise $2.5 billion to create a Bitcoin stockpile. In July, new SEC regulations espousing exchange-traded funds (ETFs) were issued, and the following week, TMTG filed SEC papers for its Crypto Blue Chip ETF.

=== World Liberty Financial ===
The market price of World Liberty's WLFI token declined after becoming publicly traded, though a Trump business entity collected a 75% cut of WLFI sales despite its decline. Donald Trump's 2025 profits reached $799 million.

Through an umbrella company, Trump and some of his family members own 60 percent of the holding company that owns World Liberty Financial (WLF), a cryptocurrency and decentralized finance firm founded in 2024, with the native digital tokens $WLFI. After deductions, the Trumps receive 75 percent of the proceeds from the sale of these tokens. Trump's New York real estate associate and Middle East envoy Steve Witkoff and his son Zach Witkoff were among the co-founders. World Liberty Financial created its stablecoin USD1 in March 2025.

In May 2025, a firm in Abu Dhabi, United Arab Emirates (UAE), said it would use US$1 to make a $2 billion investment in crypto exchange Binance, The Trumps will make tens of millions of dollars each year on this deal. The transaction made the unknown US$1 into the world's seventh-largest stablecoin. Two weeks later, by agreement with the White House, G42, controlled by Sheikh Tahnoun bin Zayed Al Nahyan who is UAE national security adviser, the president's brother, and oversees the UAE sovereign wealth fund, gained access to hundreds of thousands of advanced artificial intelligence computer chips. David Sacks received a White House ethics waiver to participate in the deal, and Steven Witkoff was in the process of divesting his share of WLF. The same month, Trump attended a gathering at the presidential palace in Abu Dhabi where he announced the chips deal, met with UAE president Sheikh Mohamed bin Zayed Al Nahyan, and saw a scale model of the center UAE intended to build using the chips.

He directly benefited from his cryptocurrency company WLF which engaged in an unprecedented mixing of private enterprise and government policy. It directly solicited access to Trump with secret payments and currency swaps from foreign investors, companies, and individuals with criminal records and investigations. At least one investigation was dropped after payment worth several million was made to the firm, and Trump granted an official pardon to an investor of a company WLF had invested in. Trump's family received a cut of all transactions made through the World Liberty, and the company directly advertised its connections to Trump. Several actions taken by Trump's administration regarding cryptocurrency were noted to bolster the company's assets and position. A spokeswoman for Trump stated that since his assets were in a trust managed by his children, there were "no conflicts of interest". Associated Press reported that Trump earned $57 million in 2024 from WLF according to his financial disclosure. The Wall Street Journal reported that WLFI tokens had a total value of $6 billion in August 2025, and that Trump himself owned two thirds of them.

==== Pakistan ====
In March 2025, Pakistan created the Pakistan Crypto Council and in April, shortly after the Indo-Pakistani conflict broke out, WLF signed a letter of intent to incorporate blockchain technology into Pakistani financial organizations. Trump praised a Pakistani Army general for his country's restraint in the brief 2025 conflict with India over Kashmir, and the general flattered Trump by nominating him for a Nobel Peace Prize that Trump is said to want because President Obama received one.

=== $Trump and $Melania memecoins ===
After a brief initial rise, the price of the $Trump meme coin declined. About 764,000 people who invested after the all time high (ATH) on 19 January 2025 lost money.

The Melania meme coin experienced extreme volatility in its first days, after which it declined in price.

In January 2025, Trump launched the $Trump meme coin, earning between $86–100 million in trading fees in two weeks. Peaking at $75.35 the day before inauguration, the coin's value then declined. Creating a contest, Trump invited the top coin holders to a private dinner to be held on May 22, bringing the coin's value back up 70 percent and the total in circulation to $2.4 billion. By April, fees collected by entities affiliated with the Trump Organization whose stake is 80 percent totaled $349 million. In January, Axios estimated that the $Trump currency "accounts for about 89 percent of Donald Trump's net worth". In May, The Economist estimated 24 percent based on Bloomberg and CoinMarketCap figures. The Campaign Legal Center director of ethics said “criminal conflicts of interest statutes don’t apply to the president” and that the contest is most likely legal.

On January 17, 2025, Trump launched, promoted, and personally benefited from a cryptocurrency memecoin, $Trump, that soared to a market valuation of over $5 billion within a few hours—a total $27 billion diluted value—through a Trump-owned company called CIC Digital LLC, which owned 80 percent of the coin's supply. Within two days, the $Trump coin became the 19th most valuable form of cryptocurrency in the world, with a total trading value of nearly $13 billion, and a total of $29 billion worth of trades based on a $64 value of each of the 200 million tokens issued by the afternoon of January 19. The New York Times reported that Trump affiliates controlled an additional 800 million tokens that, hypothetically, could be worth over $51 billion, potentially making Trump one of the richest people in the world. Trump also launched a new memecoin named after his wife$, Melania, and promoted it on Truth Social shortly before attending an inauguration rally. The crypto venture was criticized by ethics experts and government watchdogs. The venture and the possibility of foreign governments buying the coin was highlighted as possibly violating the Constitution's Foreign Emoluments Clause.
