= The Astor =

Historic building in Manhattan, New York

Coordinates: 40.781572°N 73.981852°W

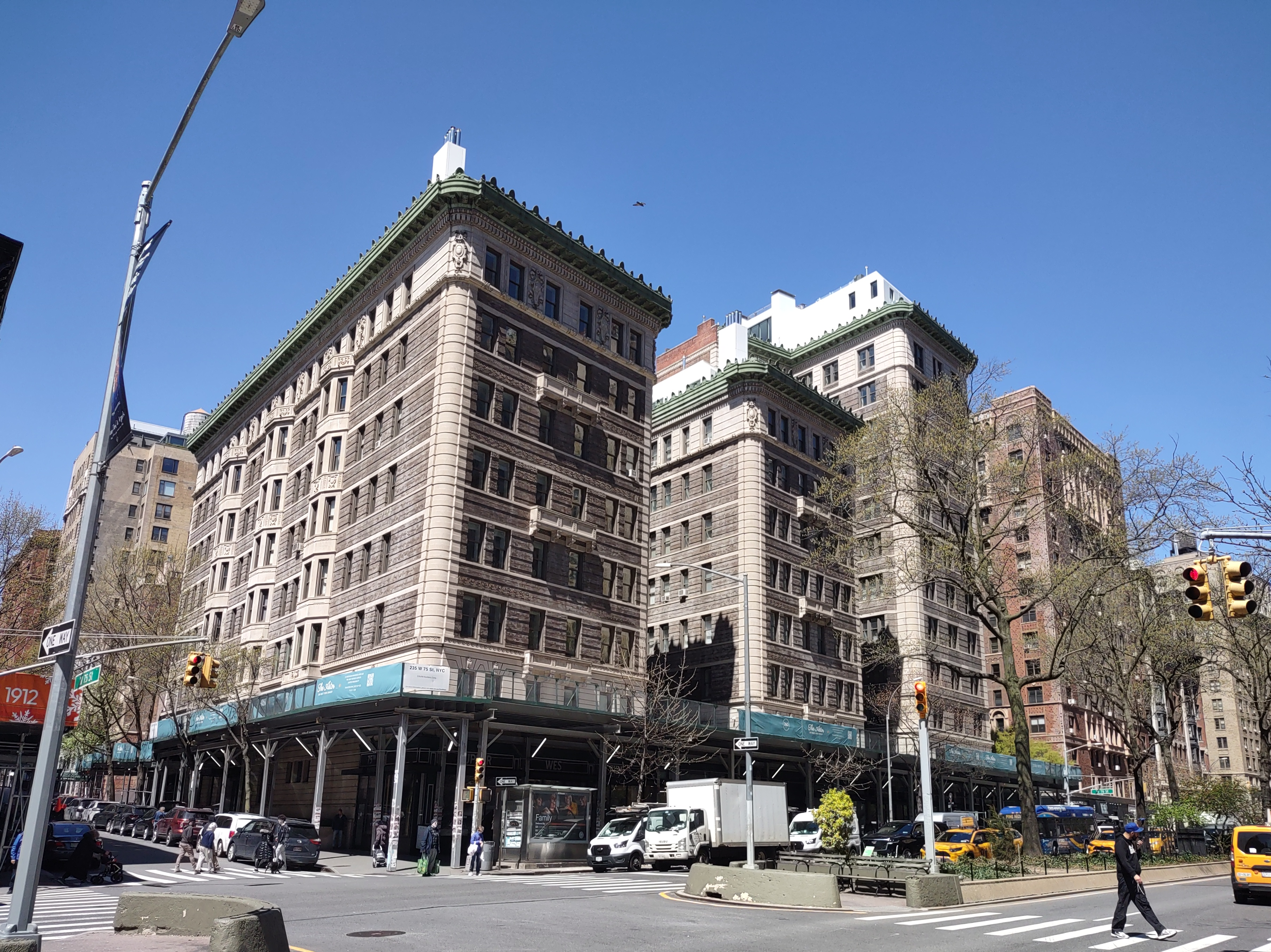
The Astor, 2025

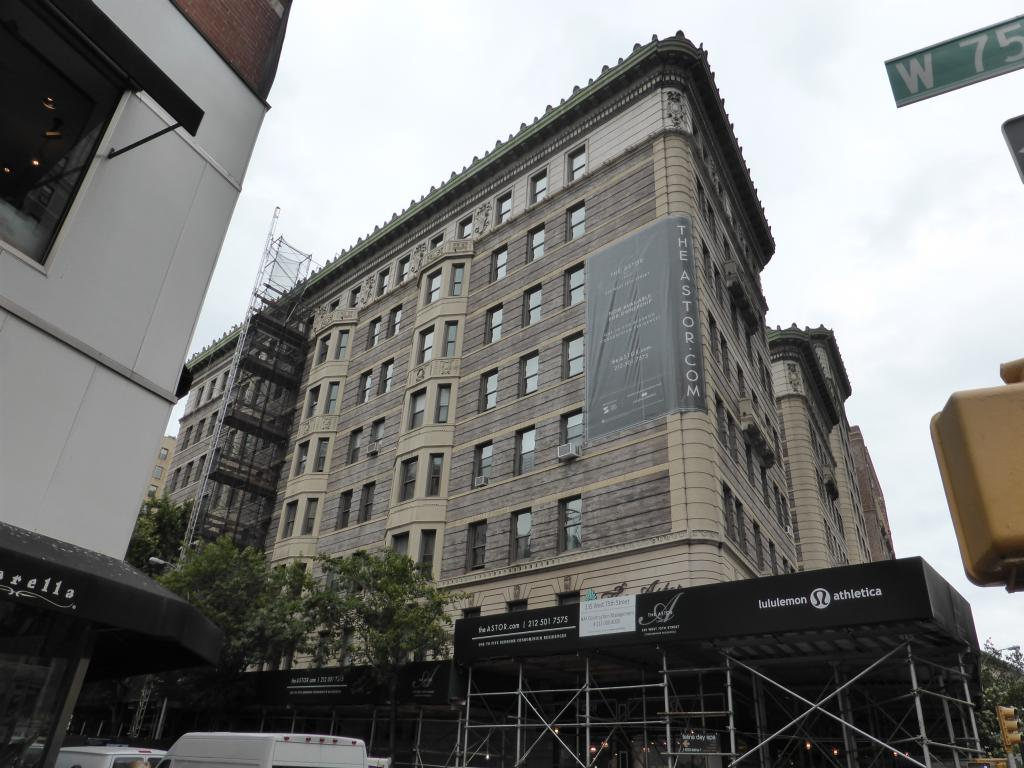
The Astor, 2015

The Astor is a building at 235 West 75th Street, on Broadway between 75th and 76th Streets, on the Upper West Side of Manhattan in New York City. William Waldorf Astor hired architects Clinton and Russell to design the two southern towers of The Astor in 1901. In 1914, William Waldorf Astor hired Peabody, Wilson & Brown to design a third tower for The Astor. The third tower, completed within a year, is structurally and aesthetically similar to both original towers. All three wings are connected at the base and have gray brick facades above a limestone base. The buildings are also distinguished by limestone quoins.

The “newer tower” is four stories taller as it accommodates larger penthouse-style apartments for the wealthy residents who were becoming increasingly attracted to the Upper West Side. This attraction was based on its proximity to Central Park, the first subway line, and Broadway, the primary corridor connecting uptown to the Financial District.

In 1977, Herbert Mandel took over the property for rental apartments and in 2014 HFZ Capital, which is headed by Ziel Feldman, brought the property for conversion to condominium apartments.

In 2021, HFZ lost control of the property, and CIM Group stepped in to complete construction and sell the remaining condo inventory.
