= Jonathan Gould =

Jonathan Gould may also refer to:

- Jonathan Gould (footballer) (born 1968), football goalkeeper (Celtic, Preston North End, Scotland national team) and coach
- Jonathan Gould (lawyer) (fl. 1990s–2020s), American lawyer and Comptroller of the Currency
- Jonathan Gould (presenter) (born 1961), British TV presenter

== See also ==
- John Gould (disambiguation)
