= Alayna Treene =

American journalist

- Born: September 8, 1994 (age 32); Skillman, New Jersey, U.S.
- Education: George Washington University (BA)
- Occupation: Journalist
- Years active: 2013–present
- Employer: CNN
- Spouse: Fred Hoban (m. 2026)

Alayna Treene (born September 8, 1994) is an American journalist. She is currently a White House Correspondent for CNN, and is known for her coverage of Donald Trump's 2024 presidential campaign. Prior to working for CNN, Treene was a reporter for Axios, where she covered Trump's first presidency, including his impeachment hearings, as well as the January 6th Committee hearings, and Congress under the Biden administration.

In November 2021, Treene was named to Forbes' "30 under 30" list for media.

== Early life and education ==
Treene was born in the Skillman section of Montgomery Township, New Jersey. She graduated summa cum laude from George Washington University in 2016 with a Bachelor of Arts degree in journalism and mass communications.

== Career ==
Treene started her career as an editorial intern at CBS News, Variety, and for Bloomberg News in London. She joined Axios as a staff reporter in 2016 before she became an associate news editor in 2018. Treene was appointed a White House and national political reporter covering the Trump administration and the impeachment inquiry in 2019. Treene now covers Congressional investigations and presidential elections. She has appeared as a political analyst on C-SPAN, Fox News, CBS News, and MSNBC.

During the 2024 presidential election, Treene covered the Trump campaign for CNN. In January 2025, Treene was named as White House reporter for CNN. On June 18, 2025, Treene asked President Donald Trump about his supporters being split on the U.S. bombing of Iran with some "wary of the U.S. getting involved in another foreign war abroad". In response to Treene's question, Trump asked "Do you ever ask a positive question at CNN? My supporters are more in love with me today, and I'm in love with them, more than they were even at election time".

== Personal life ==
On December 31, 2024, Treene became engaged to Fred Hoban, a professional poker player. Hoban proposed in their hotel room while in Palm Beach where she was covering Trump. Their wedding took place on July 17, 2026.
