= John Gould (disambiguation) =

John Gould (1804–1881) was an English ornithologist.

John Gould may also refer to:

- John Gould (of Seaborough) (fl. 1391), English MP from Somerset
- John Gould (MP) (c.1695–1740), English politician from Essex and Hertfordshire
- John Gould (Latter Day Saints) (1784–1855), early Latter Day Saint leader
- John Stanton Gould (1810–1874), American Quaker scientist and philanthropist
- John Edgar Gould (1821–1875), American hymnist and composer
- John Gould (cricketer) (1872–1908), Australian cricketer
- John Gould (columnist) (1908–2003), United States humorist
- John Groves Gould (1912–2002), lawyer and politician in British Columbia, Canada
- John Gould (footballer) (1919–1957), Scottish footballer
- John Gould (classicist) (1927–2001), British classical scholar
- John Gould (ice hockey) (born 1949), played 504 NHL games
- John Gould (Canadian writer) (born 1959), short story writer and University of Victoria faculty member
- John Jamesen Gould (J. J. Gould, born 1971), Canadian journalist

== See also ==
- Jonathan Gould (footballer) (born 1968), English footballer
- Jonathan Gould (lawyer) (fl. 1990s–2020s), American lawyer and Comptroller of the Currency
- Jonathan Gould (presenter) (born 1961), British television presenter
- Jonny Gould (fl. 1980s–2020s), British radio presenter
- John Goold (1941–2024), Australian rules footballer
