= Theodorus Klompe =

Dutch geologist

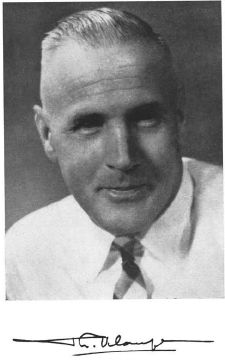
Theodorus Henricus Franciscus Klompe

Theodorus Henricus Franciscus Klompe (30 December 1903 in The Hague – 19 May 1963 in Kuala Lumpur) was a Dutch geologist and the founder of the first geological department in Bandung, Indonesia.

Education background: Doctor degree in Geology from Leiden University, completed in 1929; thesis was on the geology of the Bergamasque Alps in Northern Italy.

Career:

- 1929 - Koloniale Petroleum Maatschappij, work in North and South Sumatra, Irian and Kalimantan, also China and Japan.
- 1948 - Lecturer in Geology, University of Indonesia
- 1950 - Full professorship in the Department of Geology at the Faculty of Natural Sciences, University of Indonesia
- 1958 - Chairman of the Geological Department, Chulalongkorn University, Bangkok, Thailand.
- 1962 - Chairman of the Department of Geology, University of Malaya

He died on May 19, 1963, in Kuala Lumpur, Malaysia; his ashes were thrown in Mt. Tangkuban Perahu, West Java, Indonesia.
