= One High Line =

Pair of buildings in New York City

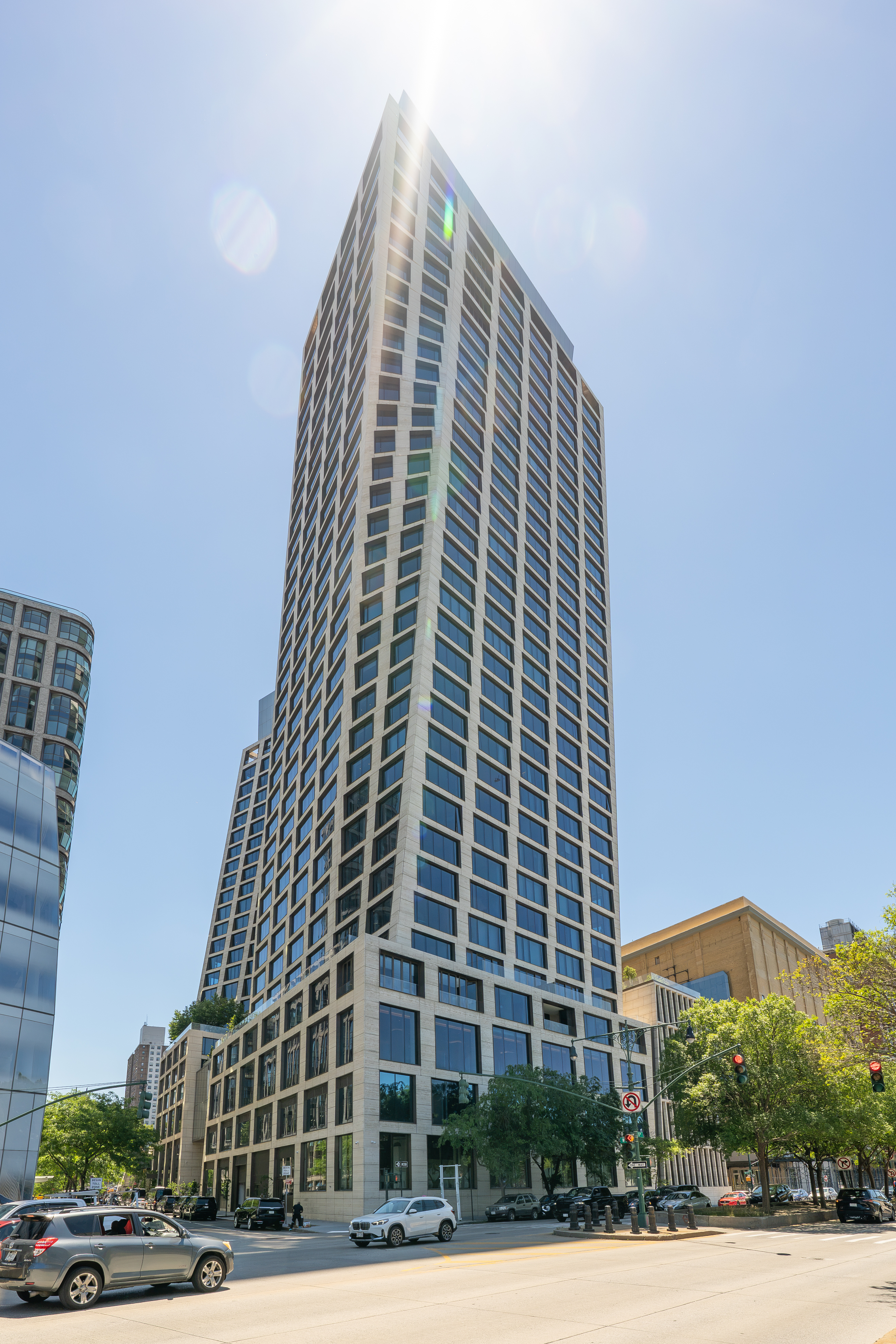
- (2026)
- Interactive map of the One High Line area

General information
- Status: Topped-out
- Type: Residential condominiums and hotel
- Location: 76 Eleventh Avenue; Manhattan, New York City
- Coordinates: 40.744747°N 74.00765°W
- Topped-out: August 2018
- Estimated completion: 2024

Height
- Height: 402 feet (123 m)

Technical details
- Floor area: 895,000 square feet (83,100 m^{2})

Design and construction
- Architect: Bjarke Ingels Group
- Developer: HFZ Capital Group
- Main contractor: Omnibuild

One High Line (formerly The XI and The Eleventh) is a pair of buildings in New York City designed by architectural firm BIG. The complex will include 247 condominiums, a 137-room Six Senses hotel, 90,000 square feet (8,400 m^{2}) of retail space, art space, a spa and club.

== Planning and construction ==
HFZ Capital Group acquired the full-block site between 17th and 18th Street, and 10th and 11th Avenue for $870 million from Edison Properties in May 2015, one of the highest prices ever paid in Manhattan for a development site. The sale price for the 36,000 square feet (3,300 m^{2}) site and 800,000 square feet (74,000 m^{2}) of air rights worked out to over $1,100 per buildable square foot, a record for a Manhattan condominium development. The site was formerly a brownfield, and HFZ received a $60 million tax credit for the environmental cleanup of the land. A consortium of lenders including JPMorgan Chase, BlackRock and SL Green provided $1 billion in acquisition and predevelopment financing at the time. HFZ expected the development to cost over $1.9 billion ($1,700 per square foot), one of the most expensive developments ever undertaken in Manhattan.

In May 2017, UK hedge fund The Children's Investment Fund provided a $1.25 billion senior mortgage to HFZ, one of the largest construction loans ever issued for a Manhattan project. The project also received $258 million from an EB-5 mezzanine loan and HFZ committed $225 million of equity. Pegasus Capital Advisors, the owners of Six Sense, also invested $30 million of equity into the hotel portion of the project.

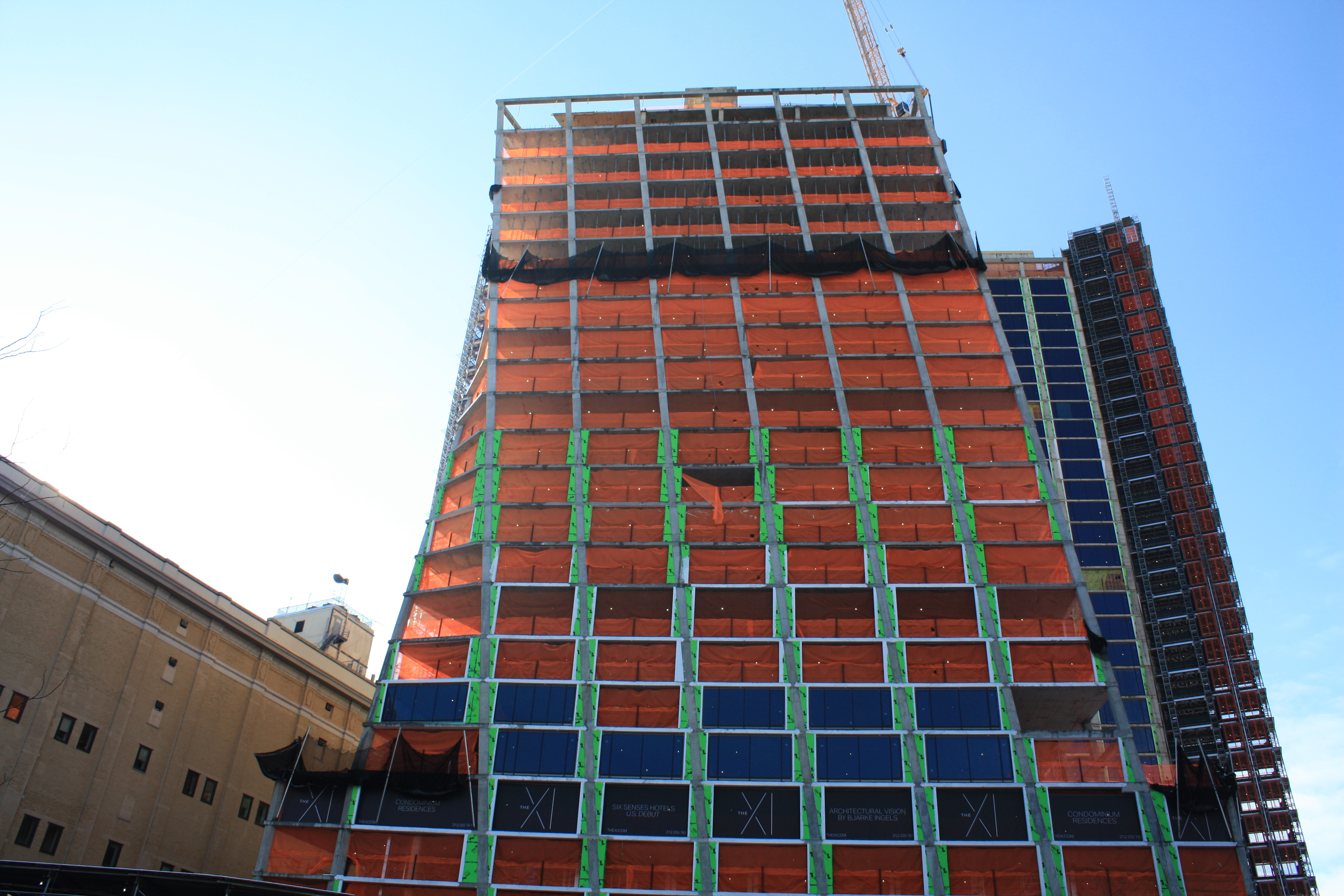
East tower under construction, 2019

Construction for the project began in September 2016 with pilings driven for the foundations of the towers. The taller West tower topped out in August 2018. Construction was expected to conclude in 2019. The shorter East tower topped out in February 2019. Exterior work and façade installation was nearing completion in October 2023.

Sales for the project began in May 2018, with prices ranging from $2.8 million for a one-bedroom to $25 million for a half-floor penthouse. Graeme Hart, the second richest person in New Zealand, reportedly bought a five bedroom, 5,783 square feet (537.3 m^{2}) penthouse for $34 million. In 2023 a 6-bedroom unit in the building is sold for $52 million, making it one the rarest apartments in Downtown Manhattan to have sold over $50 million.

== Architecture and design ==
The project consists of two towers, a 34-story Western tower named "N° I" and a 25-story Eastern tower named "N° X". The two buildings will be clad with travertine and connected by a double height sky bridge rising 21 feet (6.4 m) from floor to ceiling, called the “Bridge Lounge.” Bjarke Ingels' BIG served as executive architect for both towers with Woods Bagot as architect of record. New York-based firm Gabellini Sheppard designed the interiors of the West tower and Parisian firm Gilles & Boissier designed the interiors of the East Tower. The West tower consists of 149 condos while the East tower contains the Six Senses hotel and 87 condos beginning on the 11th floor.

The space between the two buildings serves as a porte-cochère and courtyard with plantings, designed by the Swiss landscape architect Enzo Enea. Amenities for condo owners include the "XI Club" which contains a 4,000 square feet (370 m^{2}) fitness center with a 75 feet (23 m) pool, a lounge and gallery in the glass bridge, a wine tasting room, a social lounge with billiards tables, a teen room and a children’s playroom. The "XI Gallery", a 12,000 square feet (1,100 m^{2}) art gallery, sits as street-level and features a site-specific installation by British artist Es Devlin.

At the base, the two towers separate from each other and the neighboring buildings of Chelsea to maximize space and views on the lower floors. As they rise, the towers re-orient towards the West to maximize the light afforded each unit as well as views of the Hudson River. The twisting geometry at the corners of the towers also reduces the overall bulk of the buildings and creates additional separation between the towers.

According to the architect, the façade design is inspired by the punched windows of the Meatpacking District's historic warehouses as well as the architecture of the surrounding West Chelsea neighborhood. Even though the façade is set on a sloping concrete exposure, each individual window remains rectangular and vertical. The windows are also accented by a thin metal frame, which helps them stand out against the surrounding stone.

The building sits adjacent to Frank Gehry's nearby IAC Building and is one of several designed by high-profile architects in the area after an increase in development activity due to the popularity of the High Line.

== Reception ==
The building has been described as belonging to the deconstructivism architectural movement. Reviewers have compared the complex's design to Santiago Calatrava's award-winning Turning Torso project in Malmö, Sweden as well as Rafael Viñoly's 432 Park Avenue. English abstract sculptor Henry Moore has also been cited as another inspiration. The towers have also been less favorably described as "two drunken figures on the verge of keeling over."

The bridge connecting the two towers that contains amenities and space for condo owners has been compared to the similar skybridge connecting the two towers of SHoP Architects's The Copper in Murray Hill.
