= Chris Klomp =

American businessman (born 1980/1981)

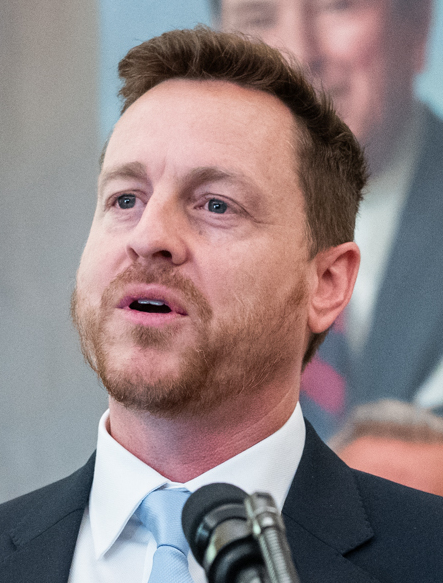
- Klomp in 2025

United States Deputy Secretary of Health and Human Services
- Nominee
- Assuming office TBD
- President: Donald Trump
- Succeeding: Jim O'Neill

Chief Counselor of the United States Department of Health and Human Services
- Incumbent
- Assumed office February 13, 2026
- President: Donald Trump
- Preceded by: Position established

Director of the Center for Medicare
- Incumbent
- Assumed office April 21, 2025
- President: Donald Trump
- Preceded by: Meena Seshamani

Personal details
- Born: Christopher Klomp; 1980 or 1981 (age 45–46)
- Children: 4
- Education: Brigham Young University (BA); Stanford University (MBA)

Christopher Klomp (born 1980 or 1981) is an American businessman who has served as the chief counselor of the United States Department of Health and Human Services since February 2026. Klomp has additionally served as the director of the center for Medicare and a deputy administrator of the Centers for Medicare and Medicaid Services since 2025.

Klomp graduated from Brigham Young University with a bachelor's degree in economics in 2004. He later attended the Stanford Graduate School of Business. Klomp worked for Bain & Company and its investment firm, Bain Capital. In 2014, he became the chief executive of Collective Medical. Klomp sold the company in 2020.

In April 2025, Klomp became the director of the Center for Medicare. In February 2026, secretary of health and human services Robert F. Kennedy Jr. named Klomp as the chief counselor of the Department of Health and Human Services. In June 2026, Trump nominated Klomp as the deputy secretary of health and human services.

== Early life and education ==
Christopher Klomp was born in 1980 or 1981. Klomp was raised in Boise, Idaho. He graduated from Boise High School in 1998. After graduating from high school, Klomp attended Brigham Young University to study microbiology and biochemistry. He switched his major to economics after doing missionary work in Romania for a former financial executive, graduating in 2004. Klomp later attended the Stanford Graduate School of Business. He is a Mormon.

== Career ==
=== Consulting (2004–2014) ===
After graduating from Brigham Young University, Klomp joined Bain & Company and later its investment firm, Bain Capital, where he worked for seven years.

=== Collective Medical (2014–2020) ===
In 2014, Klomp became the chief executive of Collective Medical, a company specializing in sharing patient data with hospitals. He participated in an event at the White House in December 2017 for electronic health record interoperability. Adam Boehler, the former director of the Center for Medicare and Medicaid Innovation, later told Stat that Klomp actively communicated with the first Trump administration on loosening restrictions on sharing health data. Jared Kushner, a senior advisor to the president, sought access to Collective Medical's patient information amid the COVID-19 pandemic in an effort to establish a national surveillance system for the virus. Klomp resigned from Collective Medical after it was acquired in 2020 to be with his wife and four children.

=== Board positions ===
Klomp served on the boards of Maven Clinic and Nomi Health.

== Director of the Center for Medicare (2025–present) ==
In November 2024, Adam Boehler recommended to Donald Trump that he hire Klomp. In January 2025, The Washington Post reported that Klomp would serve as the director of the center for Medicare. He was sworn in on April 21. As the center's director, Klomp sought aggressive cost-saving measures. He privately met with Stephen J. Hemsley, the chief executive of UnitedHealth Group, to discuss billing policies and supplemental benefits related to Medicare, and negotiated with Albert Bourla, the chief executive of Pfizer, to discuss drug prices for TrumpRx. Klomp told The Wall Street Journal in January 2026 that the Center for Medicare would focus on improving payment accuracy, giving insurers stable reimbursement, and ensuring Medicare Advantage's stability. He criticized the risk-adjustment system, stating that it overvalued large insurers.

Within the Trump administration, Klomp "quickly developed a reputation as a behind-the-scenes fixer," according to The Washington Post. His negotiations with medical companies earned Trump's praise. In February 2026, secretary of health and human services Robert F. Kennedy Jr. appointed Klomp to oversee operations at the Department of Health and Human Services as its chief counselor. The move was promoted by Susie Wiles, the White House chief of staff. Klomp's position involved directing health agencies and aligning their messages with the Trump administration's priorities. He delayed a vaccine announcement out of political concerns.

== Deputy Secretary of Health and Human Services nomination ==
On June 25, 2026, President Donald Trump announced that he would nominate Klomp as the deputy secretary of health and human services.
