= Steve Witkoff =

American businessman and diplomat (born 1957)

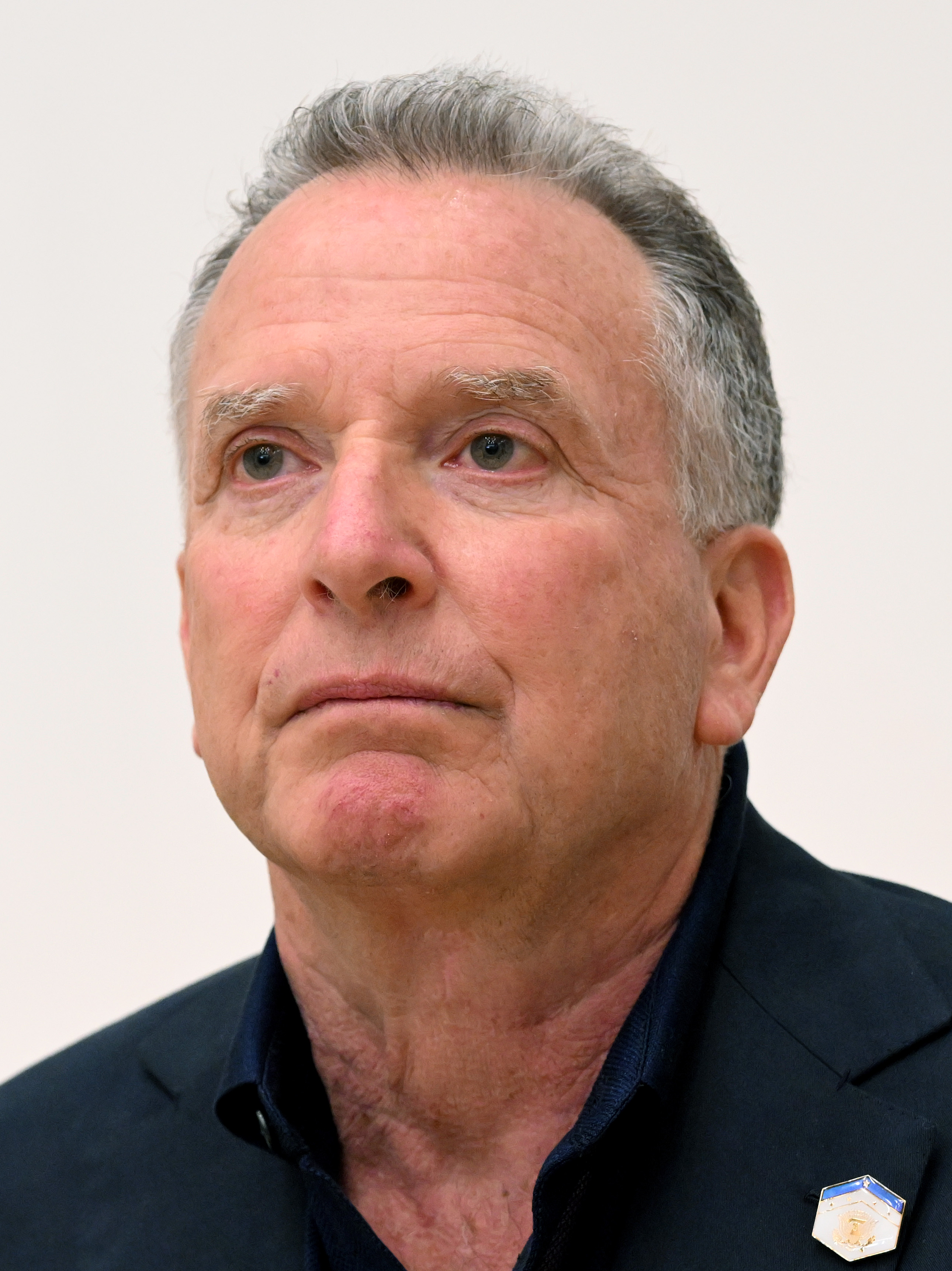
- Witkoff in 2025

United States Special Envoy to the Middle East
- Incumbent
- Assumed office May 6, 2025
- President: Donald Trump
- Deputy: Morgan Ortagus
- Preceded by: Position established

United States Special Envoy for Peace Missions
- Incumbent
- Assumed office July 3, 2025 Serving with Jared Kushner (2026–present)
- President: Donald Trump
- Preceded by: Position established

Personal details
- Born: Steven Charles Witkoff; March 15, 1957 (age 69) New York City, New York, U.S.
- Party: Republican
- Spouse: Lauren Rappoport (m. 1987, separated)
- Children: 3, including Alex and Zach
- Education: Union College (attended); Hofstra University (BA, JD)

Steven Charles Witkoff (born March 15, 1957) is an American real estate investor and former attorney who is the founder of the Witkoff Group. Since 2025, Witkoff has served as the United States special envoy to the Middle East and special envoy for peace missions. He has also acted as a de facto envoy to Russian president Vladimir Putin.

Born in the Bronx and raised on Long Island, Witkoff earned a BA in political science and a JD from Hofstra University. After starting his career as a real estate attorney, he shifted to property development in New York and Miami. Witkoff acquired buildings in Manhattan, including the Daily News Building and the Woolworth Building. During the first Trump administration, Witkoff was a member of the Great American Economic Revival Industry Groups, created to combat the economic impact of the COVID-19 pandemic in the United States.

During the second Trump administration, Witkoff has been a prominent negotiator in the Russia–Ukraine War where he was criticized for perceived pro-Russian positions in negotiations and for allegedly advising the Russian government on how to negotiate. Witkoff has also been active in negotiations in the Middle East. During his tenure in the second Trump administration, he and his family have maintained extensive business ties with Middle East governments, including through World Liberty Financial, a cryptocurrency firm founded by his sons and Trump family members, raising conflict of interest concerns. As of April 2026, Forbes estimated his net worth at US$2.3 billion. One year into his tenure in the second Trump administration, Witkoff had increased his wealth by 15%, primarily driven by his investments into World Liberty Financial.

== Early life ==
Witkoff was born in the Bronx in New York City, and raised in Baldwin Harbor and Old Westbury on Long Island. He is the son of Martin Witkoff and Lois née Birnbaum; Witkoff is Jewish. His father was the president of a women's clothing manufacturer named George Simonton Inc., and his mother was an interior designer.

Witkoff began his studies at Union College in Schenectady, New York, but he chose to transfer to Hofstra University, where he earned a BA in political science in 1980. In 1983, he graduated with a JD from Hofstra Law School.

Witkoff's first job as a lawyer was with the firm, Dreyer & Traub in New York City. Donald Trump was a client, and they met through work in 1986. They later developed a business relationship which evolved into a personal friendship.

== Private sector career ==
Witkoff began his career as a real estate lawyer. In November 2024, The Wall Street Journal reported that "Peers in the real-estate world invariably describe Witkoff [...] as smart, personable, and a talented negotiator with a common touch."

=== Stellar Management ===
In 1985, he co-founded Stellar Management, partnering with fellow Dreyer & Traub real estate attorney Larry Gluck—"Stellar" is derived from the names "Steve" and "Larry"—gradually switching their careers from the practice of law to owning and managing real estate. They purchased inexpensive apartment buildings in Washington Heights, Manhattan and the Northwest Bronx; at one point they owned 85 buildings with over 3,000 apartments. In 1995, he expanded into lower Manhattan, buying several inexpensive office buildings. In 1996, he secured financing from Credit Suisse First Boston for the purchase of 33 Maiden Lane, a 27-story tower designed by Philip Johnson and John Burgee; the following year, he leased the top 13 floors of the building to the Federal Reserve Bank of New York for a 25-year term.

=== Witkoff Group ===
In 1997, Witkoff left Stellar Management, founded and became chairman and CEO of the privately held Witkoff Group headquartered in New York City, and expanded into residential construction and land rehabilitation. In 1996, he and business partner Rubin Schron purchased the Daily News Building for $138 million, and he expanded his portfolio to include real estate purchases in Chicago, Dallas, and Philadelphia. By October 1998, the Witkoff Group operated 11 million square feet of commercial and retail real estate, and held an ownership interest in 7,500 apartments and a number of land and hotel developments. In 1998, a planned $2 billion initial public offering (IPO) of his company was canceled due to the collapse of the real estate market, and Witkoff and Gluck dissolved their partnership, with Gluck taking the residential properties and Witkoff the office buildings.

In 2013, Witkoff and Harry Macklowe purchased the Park Lane Hotel on Central Park South in Manhattan for $660 million. That year, Witkoff and Fisher Brothers also purchased a parcel of land in Tribeca in Manhattan for $223 million on which they built a 792-foot high residential tower, 111 Murray Street. Over time, Witkoff diversified into higher-profile properties, including landmark buildings in Manhattan such as the Woolworth Building in Tribeca.

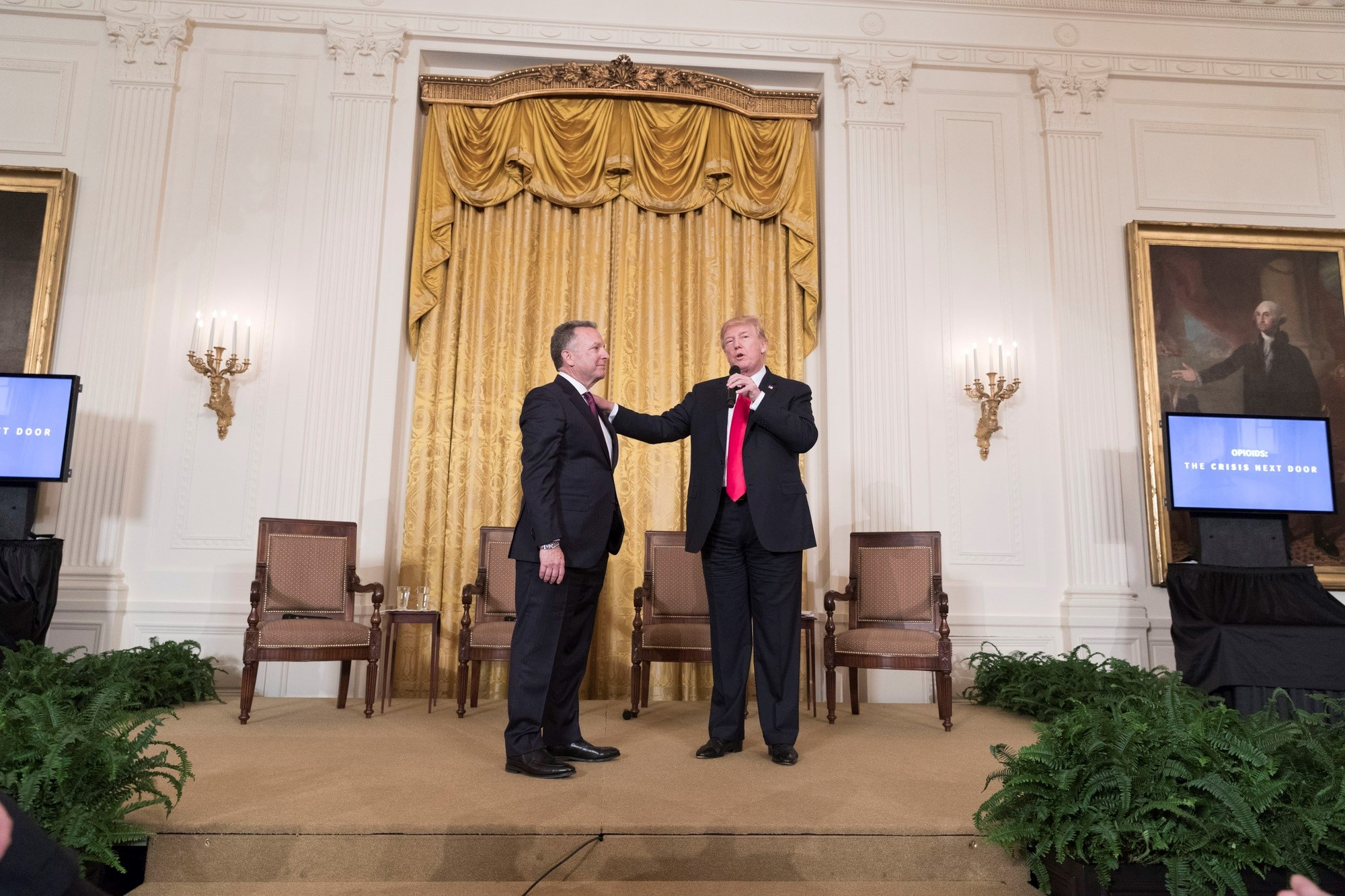
Witkoff with US President Donald Trump, March 1, 2018

As of 2019, the Witkoff Group owned about 50 properties in the United States and internationally.

The Witkoff Group purchased the project to build the resort and casino Fontainebleau Las Vegas for $600 million. The property was scheduled to open in 2020 as The Drew, named after Witkoff's late son Andrew. However, construction stopped in March 2020, due to the COVID-19 pandemic in Nevada. In February 2021, Koch Real Estate Investments purchased the property. The original name was reinstated, and the hotel opened in December 2023.

Also in 2023, Bloomberg reported that Witkoff helped revive the troubled One High Line condominium project in Manhattan, completing its transition to new ownership and development. That year, the Witkoff Group and Monroe Capital closed on a loan for the redevelopment of the Shore Club Private Collection in Miami Beach.

In July 2025, Bloomberg reported that Witkoff sold a property on the Miami Beach waterfront for more than double its purchase price. In 2025, Witkoff partnered with Len Blavatnik and Barry Sternlicht on a stalled Miami Beach project.

==== First Donald Trump administration ====
During the first Donald Trump administration, the Qatari government was a key source of funds for the Witkoff Group. According to the New York Times, the Qatari government sought to curry favor with the Trump administration by forming close relationships with Trump confidantes, including Witkoff. At the time, the Witkoff Group was facing financial problems, making the Qatari financing important.

==== Second Donald Trump administration ====
After his appointment as the second Donald Trump administration's envoy to the Middle East, Witkoff maintained extensive business ties in the Middle East. In early 2025, as Witkoff was engaged in high-stakes negotiations with Middle Eastern governments over a ceasefire in the Israeli–Palestinian conflict, his son Alexander was soliciting several of the same governments for billions of dollars of investment into his enterprises, including the cryptocurrency firm World Liberty Financial (WLF). When asked about possible conflicts of interest in September 2025 (he had retained ownership in the Witkoff Group), a White House spokesperson said Witkoff was "finalizing" his divestment from the firm. In April 2026, Forbes reported that Witkoff had increased his wealth by 15% over the course of one year in the Trump administration.

In September 2026, Witkoff traveled to Moscow and met with Russian President Vladimir Putin for approximately three hours alongside Jared Kushner as part of renewed U.S. efforts to negotiate an end to the Russian invasion of Ukraine. They then visited Kyiv for the first time as envoys and met with Volodymyr Zelenskyy.

== Political career ==
In April 2020, during the first presidency of Donald Trump, Witkoff had a minor role as a member of the Great American Economic Revival Industry Group, which was created by Trump to combat the economic impact of the COVID-19 pandemic in the United States.

In July 2024, Witkoff gave a speech on night four of the Republican National Convention.

On September 15, 2024, Witkoff was playing golf with Trump at Trump International Golf Club in West Palm Beach, Florida, when Ryan Wesley Routh attempted to assassinate Trump. A Secret Service officer fired at the gunman, who fled in a vehicle and was later apprehended.

=== Second Trump presidency ===
On November 9, 2024, Witkoff was chosen to be co-chair of the Presidential Inaugural Committee for Trump's upcoming second presidency, along with former US Senator Kelly Loeffler.

On November 12, 2024, President-elect Donald Trump announced that he had selected Witkoff to be his Special Envoy to the Middle East. Witkoff had no diplomatic experience.

During Trump's second term, he was appointed special envoy to the Middle East. In December 2024, before Trump formally took office, Witkoff worked to help push negotiations that led to a ceasefire and hostage exchange between Israel and Hamas in January and October 2025.

While in office, he played a role in key geopolitical negotiations, including on issues unrelated to the Middle East, and was appointed Special Envoy for Peace Missions on July 3, 2025.

==== Middle East ====
Witkoff played a key role in negotiating a ceasefire and hostage exchange between Israel and Hamas in January 2025, along with Brett McGurk, President Biden's lead negotiator who invited Witkoff to join the negotiations, and Qatari prime minister Sheikh Mohammed bin Abdulrahman Al Thani, who it was agreed would be the one who would speak to Hamas. There followed a six-week ceasefire agreement, during which there would be a swap of 33 Hamas-held hostages taken in the October 7 attacks for approximately 1,000 Palestinian prisoners, some of whom were serving life sentences for murder, and steps toward further exchanges and ending a prolonged 15-month war.

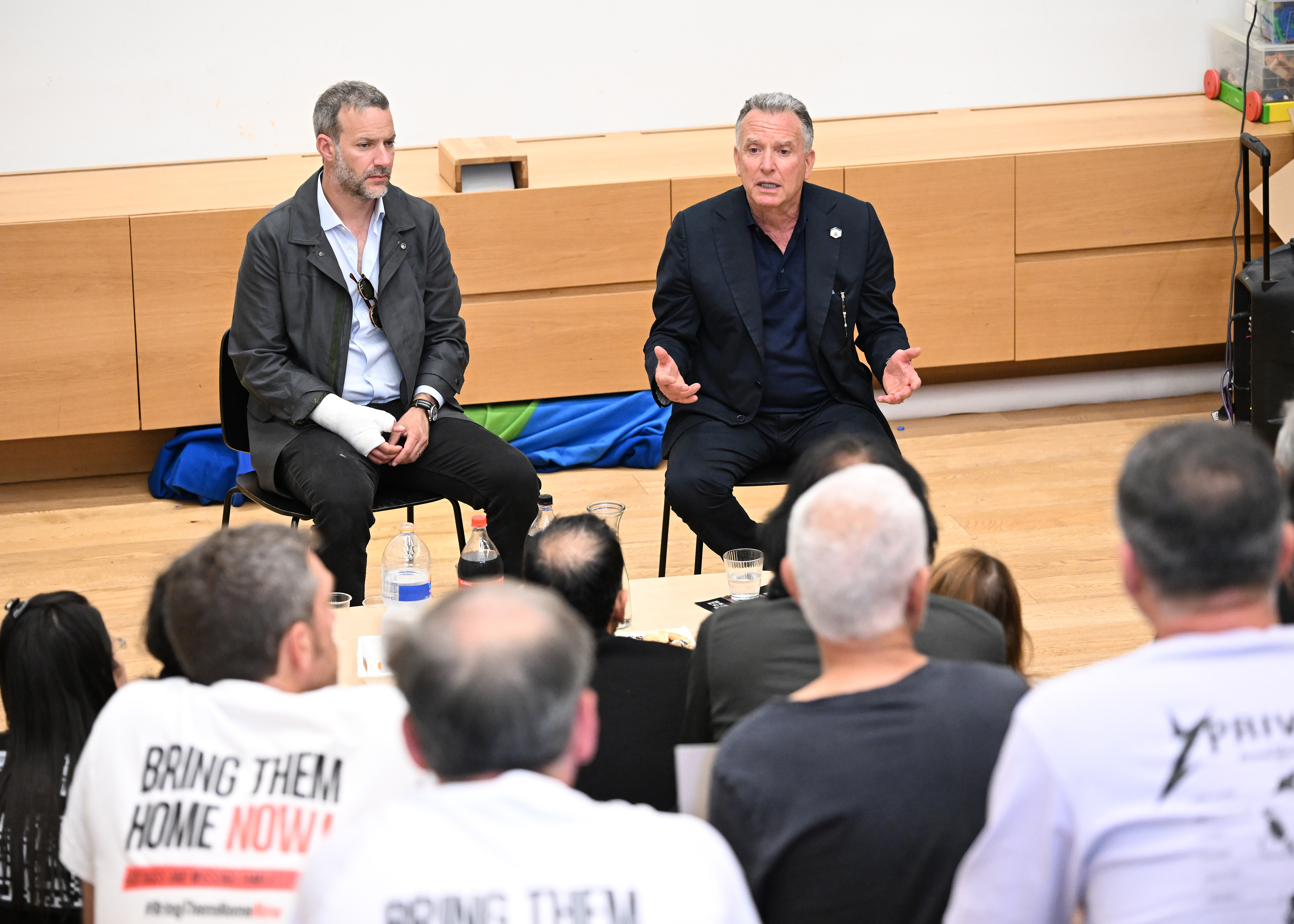
Witkoff with the families of the Israeli hostages in Tel Aviv on May 13, 2025

Witkoff's approach differed from traditional diplomatic methods, as he, joined by McGurk on speakerphone from Qatar, applied pressure on Israeli Prime Minister Benjamin Netanyahu to finalize the deal, stressing that Trump wanted the deal done, achieving in the final weeks what had been in negotiation for nearly a year. The New York Times wrote, "It was a vivid example of cooperation between two men representing bitter political rivals. Rarely if ever have teams of current and new presidents of different parties worked together at such a high-stakes moment, with the fate of American lives and the future of a devastating war hanging in the balance."

On January 29, 2025, Witkoff arrived in Israel and made a rare entry by an American official into Gaza to personally oversee the ceasefire between Israel and Hamas.

On March 2, 2025, the Israeli government stopped the entry of goods and supplies into the Gaza Strip. The office of prime minister Netanyahu claimed they were acting upon a proposal Witkoff had originally presented. The new plan did not mention an Israeli retreat from positions in Gaza after half of the hostages had been released in phase one of the 2025 Gaza war ceasefire. The existence of a "Witkoff-plan" had not been confirmed by Washington as of March 3, 2025.

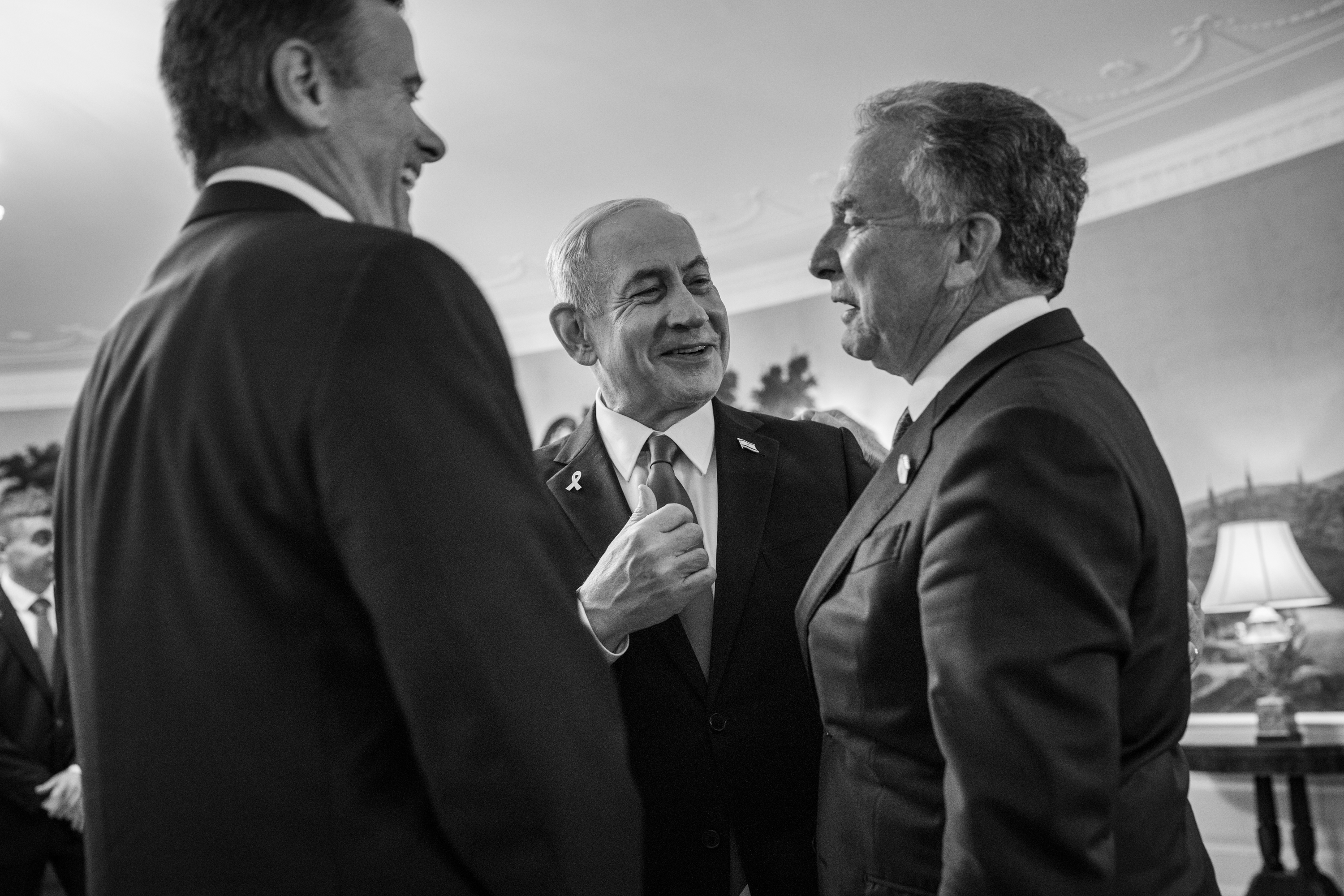
Witkoff and CIA Director John Ratcliffe with Israeli Prime Minister Benjamin Netanyahu on July 7, 2025

Instead of continuing to the second phase of the ceasefire per the original agreement, Israel proposed a new plan (called the "Witkoff plan" after Steve Witkoff), in which Hamas would release the Israeli captives in exchange for a 50-day extension of the ceasefire, with Israel retaining the option of returning to war. Hamas rejected this new proposal, which differed from the terms agreed in January 2025.

On March 23, 2025, Witkoff blamed Hamas for renewed fighting in Gaza, saying that "Hamas had every opportunity to demilitarize, to accept the bridging proposal that would have given us a 40- or 50-day ceasefire where we could have discussed demilitarization and a final truce."

In April 2025, Witkoff had an unannounced meeting in Paris with two Israeli officials ahead of the US-led nuclear talks with Iran. He represented the Trump administration's push for a diplomatic resolution.

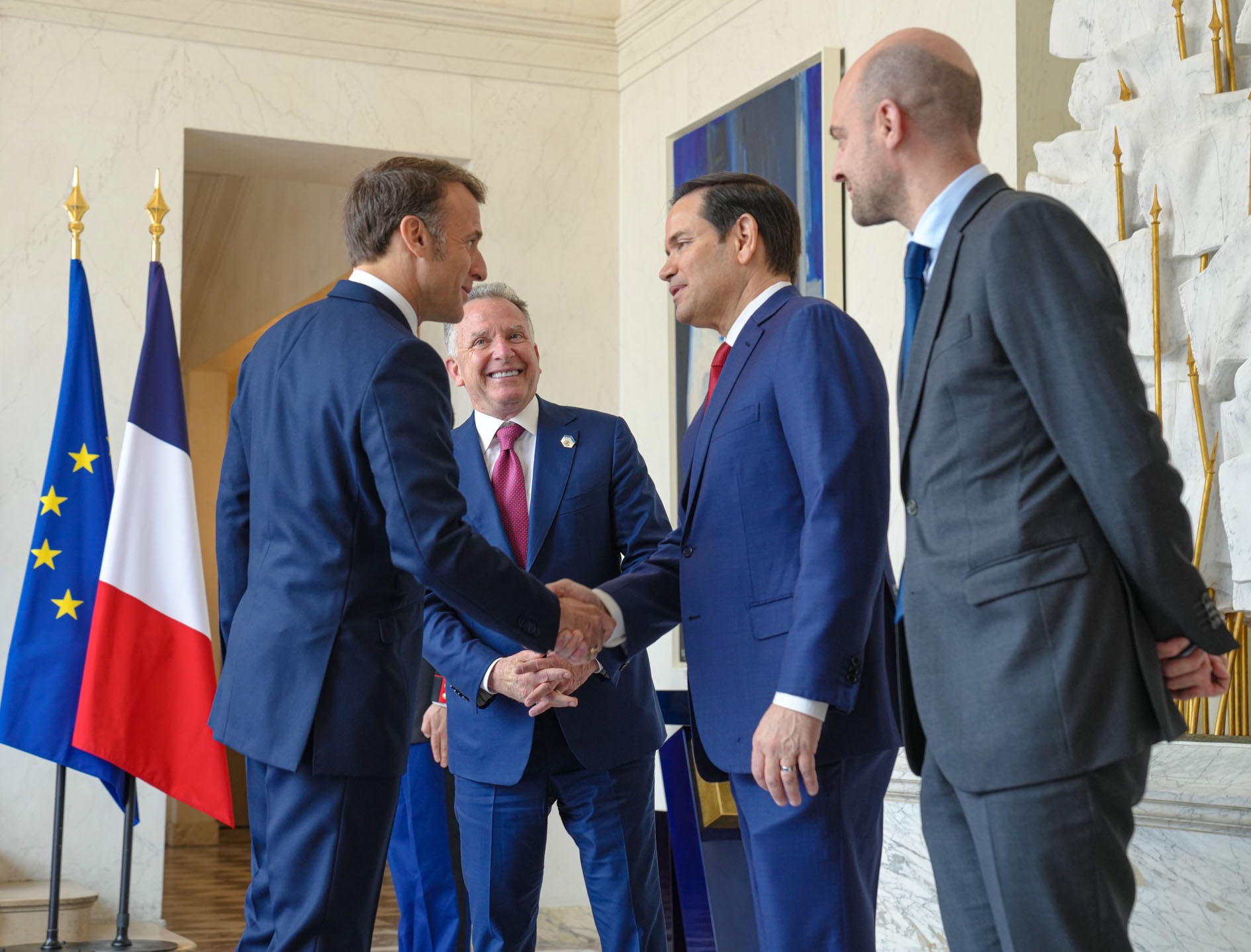
Witkoff with French President Emmanuel Macron, Secretary of State Marco Rubio and French Foreign Minister Jean-Noël Barrot in Paris, France, April 17, 2025

The first round of high level-meetings was held in Oman on April 12, 2025, led by Witkoff and Iranian Foreign Minister Abbas Araghchi. Following the June 2025 Israeli strikes in Iran, diplomatic talks about nuclear energy between US and Iran were indefinitely suspended.

Witkoff held a high-level secret meeting with Reza Pahlavi, the exiled crown prince of Iran, to discuss the 2025–2026 Iranian protests. This was the first such contact between the Trump administration and the Iranian opposition since the protests escalated.

In mid-January 2026, reports emerged that Iranian Foreign Minister Abbas Araghchi sent a personal message to Witkoff stating that Iran had canceled the planned execution of 800 anti-regime protesters. This communication reportedly played a key role in dissuading President Trump from ordering immediate military strikes against Iran.

In early 2026, the United States and Iran engaged in high-stakes negotiations led by Witkoff and Presidential Advisor Jared Kushner. These talks were ended by the U.S. and Israel joint attack on Iran on 28 February 2026. According to The Guardian, a Gulf diplomat described Witkoff and Kushner as acting like "Israeli assets", accusing them of manipulating Trump into the 2026 Iran war and engaging in "unorthodox and destructive diplomacy" during nuclear talks.

==== Negotiations with Russia ====
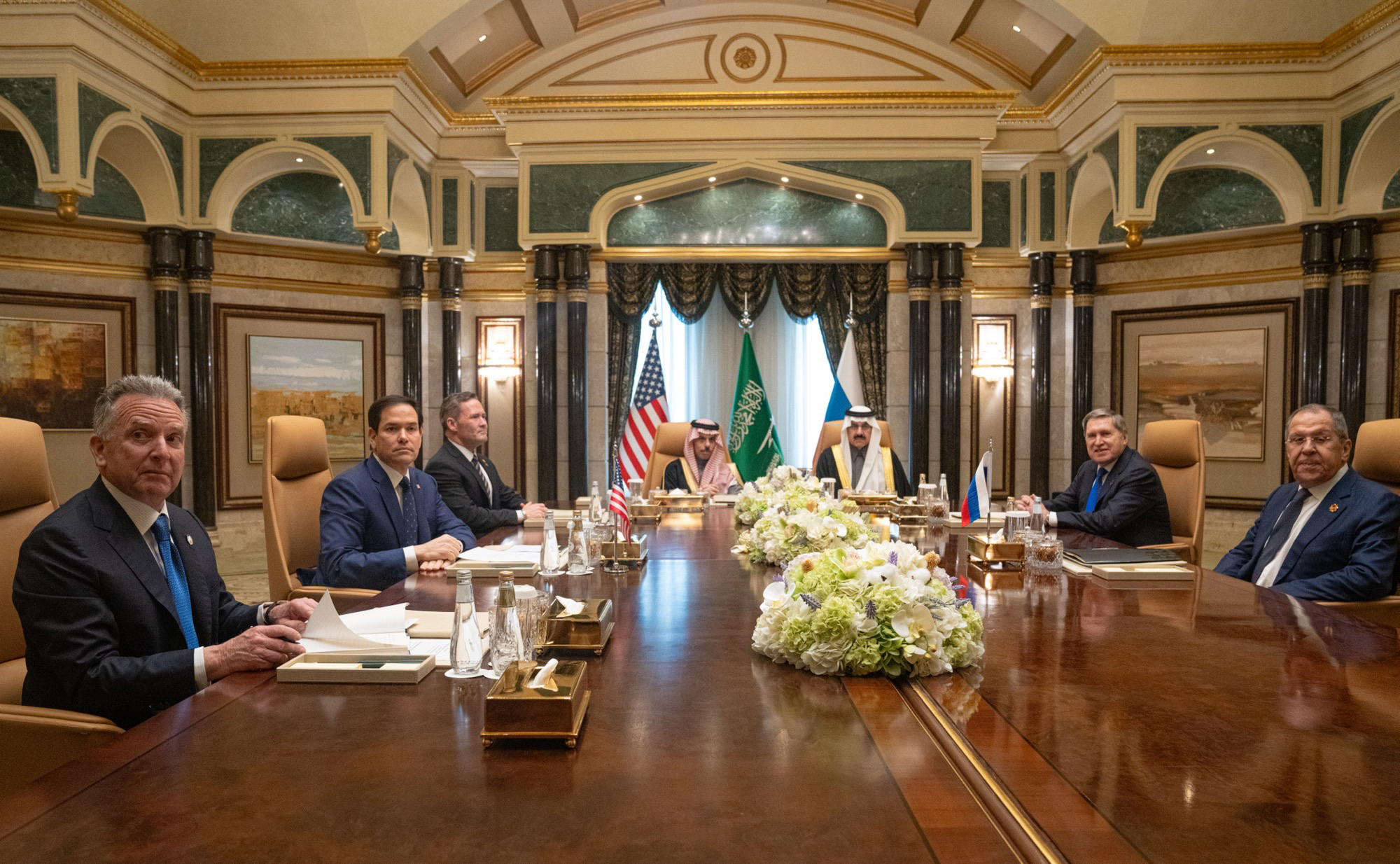
Witkoff with U.S., Saudi, and Russian officials meeting in Riyadh, February 18, 2025

President Trump made Witkoff his de facto envoy to Russian president Vladimir Putin. By March 2025, Witkoff had become the main channel of communication between the Trump administration and the Russian presidency. Lacking formal training in diplomacy, he conducted key meetings in ways that breached standard diplomatic protocol, raising concerns about the accuracy, trustworthiness, and effectiveness of such engagements.

On February 11, 2025, Trump sent Witkoff to Moscow, where he met with President Putin and was responsible for the negotiations that led to a prisoner swap and the release of U.S. citizen Marc Fogel from a Russian prison, in exchange for Russian citizen Alexander Vinnik. Witkoff said that Putin and Trump "had a great friendship, and I think now it's going to continue, and it's a really good thing for the world". Witkoff said he "spent a lot of time with Putin" during the secret trip and had developed a "friendship and relationship" with Putin.

On February 16, 2025, Witkoff rejected concerns that Ukraine and Europe would be excluded from any future peace negotiations in the Russian invasion of Ukraine. On February 18, American and Russian delegations, headed by U.S. Secretary of State Marco Rubio and Russian Foreign Minister Sergey Lavrov, respectively, met in Riyadh, Saudi Arabia, to develop a framework for further peace negotiations. Rubio was accompanied by Steve Witkoff and former U.S. National Security Advisor Mike Waltz.

On March 21, 2025, in a podcast interview with Tucker Carlson, Witkoff said that the biggest issue in negotiations are the "so-called four regions: Donbas, Crimea, Lugansk . . . and there's two others". Russia occupied and annexed Crimea in 2014, then occupied and annexed four more Ukrainian provinces during its 2022 invasion. (Donbas in not a Ukrainian region, but a collective name for the regions of Donetsk and Luhansk.) He said that the populations in those provinces were Russian-speaking and "there were referendums where the vast majority of people indicated that they wanted to be under Russian rule"; the polls were considered a "sham" by the U.S., Ukraine, and most of the international community.

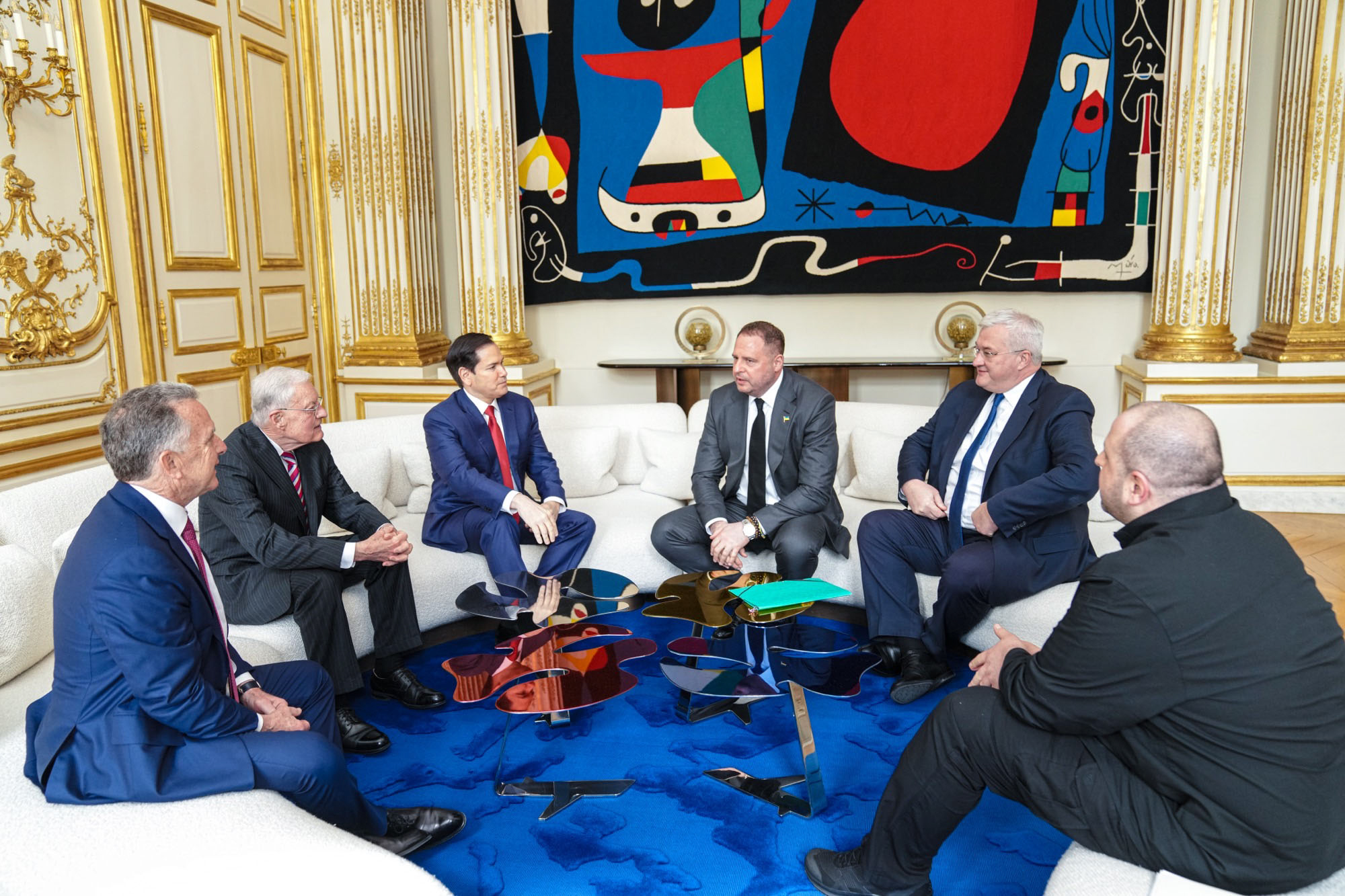
Witkoff and Rubio with Ukrainian Foreign Minister Andrii Sybiha, Defense Minister Rustem Umerov, and Presidential Advisor Andriy Yermak at the Elysee Palace in Paris, France, April 17, 2025

In the interview, Witkoff spoke positively of Vladimir Putin. He called Putin a "great guy" and "super smart." Witkoff said, "I liked him, I think he was honest" and "I don't regard Putin as a bad guy". According to Witkoff, Putin told him that he prayed for "his friend" Donald Trump following the assassination attempt in Pennsylvania. He recalled that "President Putin had commissioned a beautiful portrait of President Trump, from the leading Russian artist, and actually gave it to me and asked me to take it home to President Trump". Ukraine's president, Volodymyr Zelenskyy, said that Ukrainians were "very disturbed" by Witkoff's comments and believed he had been influenced by Russian disinformation. Journalist Stephen Pollard commented that Witkoff may mean well, but was embarrassingly out of his depth dealing with Putin.

In April 2025, Witkoff met with Putin in Moscow. Witkoff did not bring his own interpreter to the meetings, instead relying on Kremlin-provided translators. The decision was noted as a departure from standard diplomatic protocol, with former U.S. ambassador Michael McFaul commenting that "the language is never the same" when using only host-country interpreters.

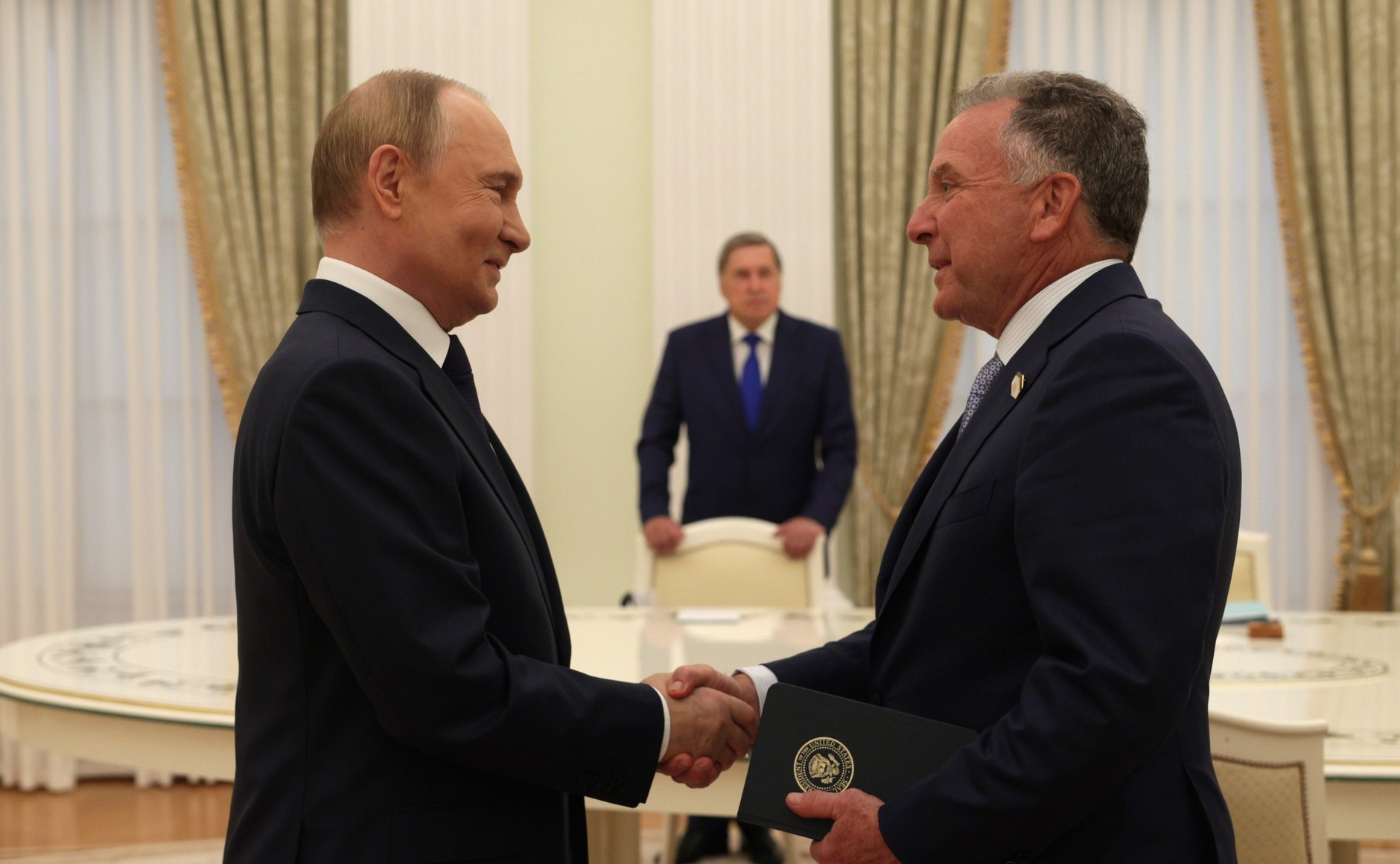
Witkoff with Russian President Vladimir Putin at the Moscow Kremlin, August 6, 2025

In early August 2025, Witkoff traveled to Moscow for another round of talks with Putin. During the meeting, Witkoff reportedly misunderstood Putin's remarks—interpreting a suggestion that he was open to a "peaceful withdrawal" of Ukrainian forces from occupied territories as an offer for Russian forces to withdraw from regions such as Kherson and Zaporizhzhia. This misinterpretation, conveyed back to Washington, seemingly prompted President Trump to pause new sanctions and extend an invitation to Putin for a summit in Alaska. Critics argue that Putin "was rewarded not with debilitating sanctions but with an invitation to meet," reflecting the fallout from this diplomatic confusion. Before co-founding Stellar Management, Witkoff practiced real estate law at Dreyer & Traub and Rosenman & Colin.

The Alaska 2025 summit took place on August 15, 2025. Coverage of the meeting highlighted that the summit was marked more by symbolic pageantry, such as flyovers and photo-ops, than substantive progress. Commentators further argued that entrusting such responsibilities to a real estate executive instead of trained diplomats not only compromised the talks but set a precedent for sidelining expertise in critical foreign policy negotiations.

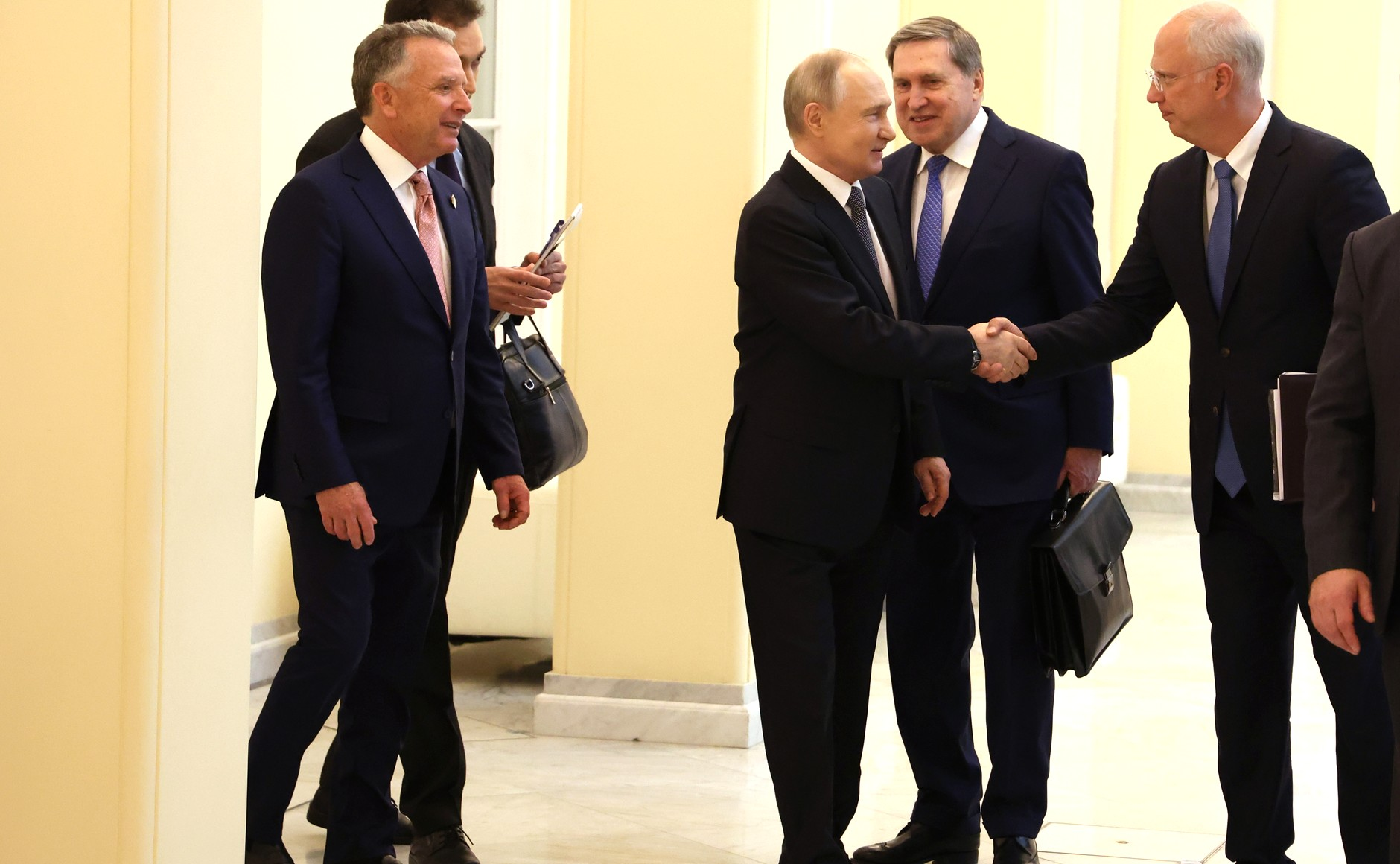
Witkoff with Putin, Presidential Aide Yuri Ushakov and Special Envoy Kirill Dmitriev in St. Petersburg, Russia, April 2025

On August 17, 2025, Witkoff claimed that, during the Alaska summit, Putin had promised to enshrine a non-aggression pledge in Russia's constitution. His statements were dismissed as naïve and dangerously misguided, given Russia's history of using constitutional amendments to consolidate power and justify territorial expansion rather than promote peace.

On November 19, 2025, Axios reported that Witkoff had drafted a 28-point U.S. peace plan with Russian envoy Kirill Dmitriev. The document called for significant Ukrainian concessions, including ceding territory, limiting the size of its armed forces, and renouncing NATO membership. The plan generated confusion and controversy, particularly regarding its authorship. Analysts noted that certain phrases in the English version appeared to reflect Russian syntax or translation artifacts, suggesting that the text may have been drafted originally in Russian before being translated into English. The plan includes provisions for using Russian state assets frozen in the EU to fund U.S.-led reconstruction efforts in Ukraine, with the United States receiving up to 50% of the investment profits; critics have accused the U.S. of war profiteering as a result. Western officials observed that the proposal might serve as a basis for negotiation but required substantial revision, citing its alignment with Russian demands. Several U.S. senators, including Mike Rounds and Angus King, stated that Secretary of State Marco Rubio had told them the plan "was not the administration's plan" and resembled "a wish list of the Russians." Rubio denied this characterization. This episode has been cited as further evidence that the involvement of an inexperienced and unofficial negotiator like Witkoff introduced significant risks, raising concerns about the potential implications of unauthorized diplomacy. Witkoff was criticized by diplomats and politicians alike for taking a pro Russian position in the 28-points and forwarding a plan which would divert substantial amounts of frozen Russian funds held in Europe by Belgium, from Ukraine to the USA.

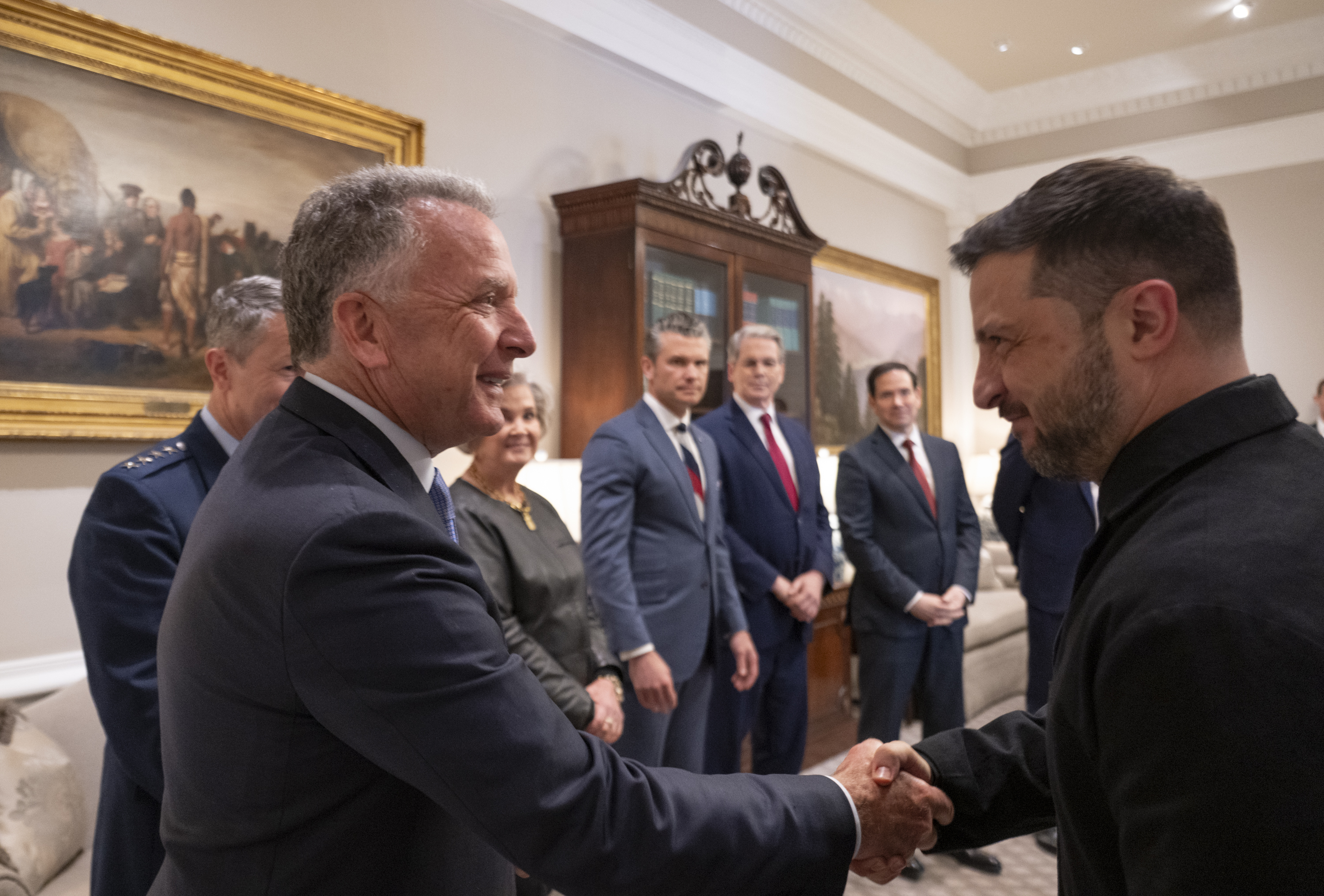
Witkoff with Ukrainian President Volodymyr Zelenskyy at the White House, October 17, 2025

On November 25, 2025, Bloomberg published a transcript of a 5-minute phone call on October 14, 2025, between Witkoff and Yuri Ushakov, Vladimir Putin's most senior foreign policy adviser. The transcript showed Witkoff giving Ushakov advice on negotiating with President Trump. The leak led to condemnation of Witkoff by several members of Congress, including Representative Ted Lieu, who wrote Witkoff was a "traitor" on X. Representative Don Bacon called for Witkoff's immediate dismissal, writing "For those who oppose the Russian invasion and want to see Ukraine prevail as a sovereign & democratic country, it is clear that Witkoff fully favors the Russians," on X, and Representative Brian Fitzpatrick wrote "This is a major problem. And one of the many reasons why these ridiculous side shows and secret meetings need to stop." Anne Applebaum wrote that Witkoff's interventions kept helping Russia in the Ukraine War. Trump later defended Witkoff's call, describing it as a "very standard form of negotiations".

== Views ==
Witkoff is described as realist and transactionalist, relying heavily on intuition and professional experience in real-estate. He grounds his role in a pragmatic understanding of United States interests and a skepticism of multilateralism, believing conflicts can be resolved through power politics and personal diplomacy between politically strong heads of government, with mutual economic interests overcoming sectarianism and mattering more than territorial disputes.

Alongside Special Envoy Jared Kushner, Witkoff believes in a small, dedicated negotiating team to secure international agreements, and that the fallout from such agreements could be leveraged toward another agreement.

He sees figures like Iranian Supreme Leader Ali Khamenei and Russian President Vladimir Putin as negotiating astutely in their best interests rather than being ideologically motivated. At the same time, he is more skeptical of Israeli diplomatic positions.

=== Egypt ===
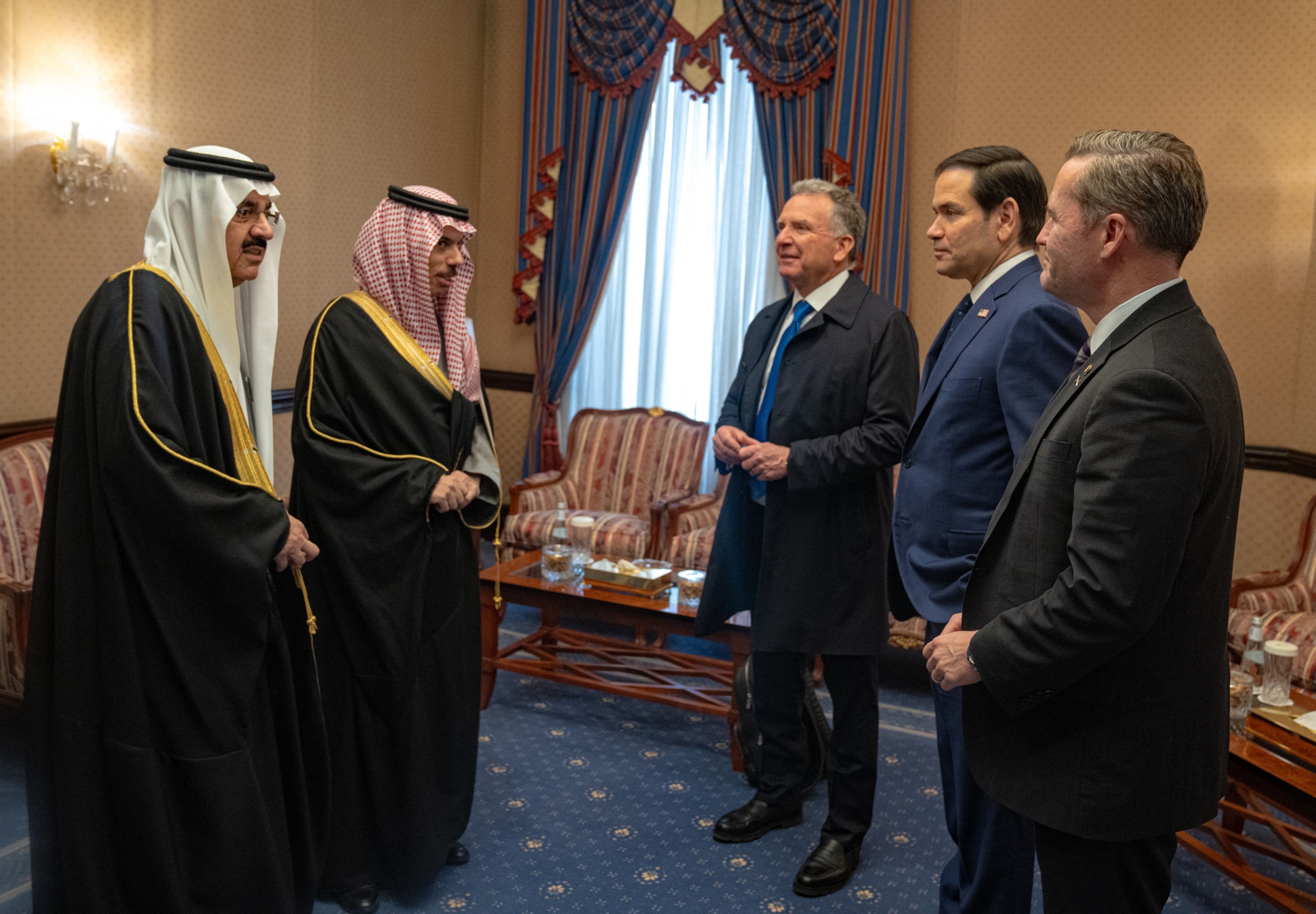
Witkoff, Rubio, and Waltz with Saudi Foreign Minister Faisal bin Farhan Al Saud in Riyadh, Saudi Arabia

In March 2025, Witkoff expressed concern that Israel's war in Gaza could destabilize Middle Eastern countries such as Egypt and Saudi Arabia. He stated that the youth unemployment rate in Egypt is 45% and that the country is bankrupt, saying that a "country can't exist like that. They're largely broke. They need a lot of help."

=== Syria ===
In March 2025, Witkoff suggested that Syria's new leader Ahmed al-Sharaa may have changed since his association with Al-Qaeda.

=== Israel and the Palestinian territories ===
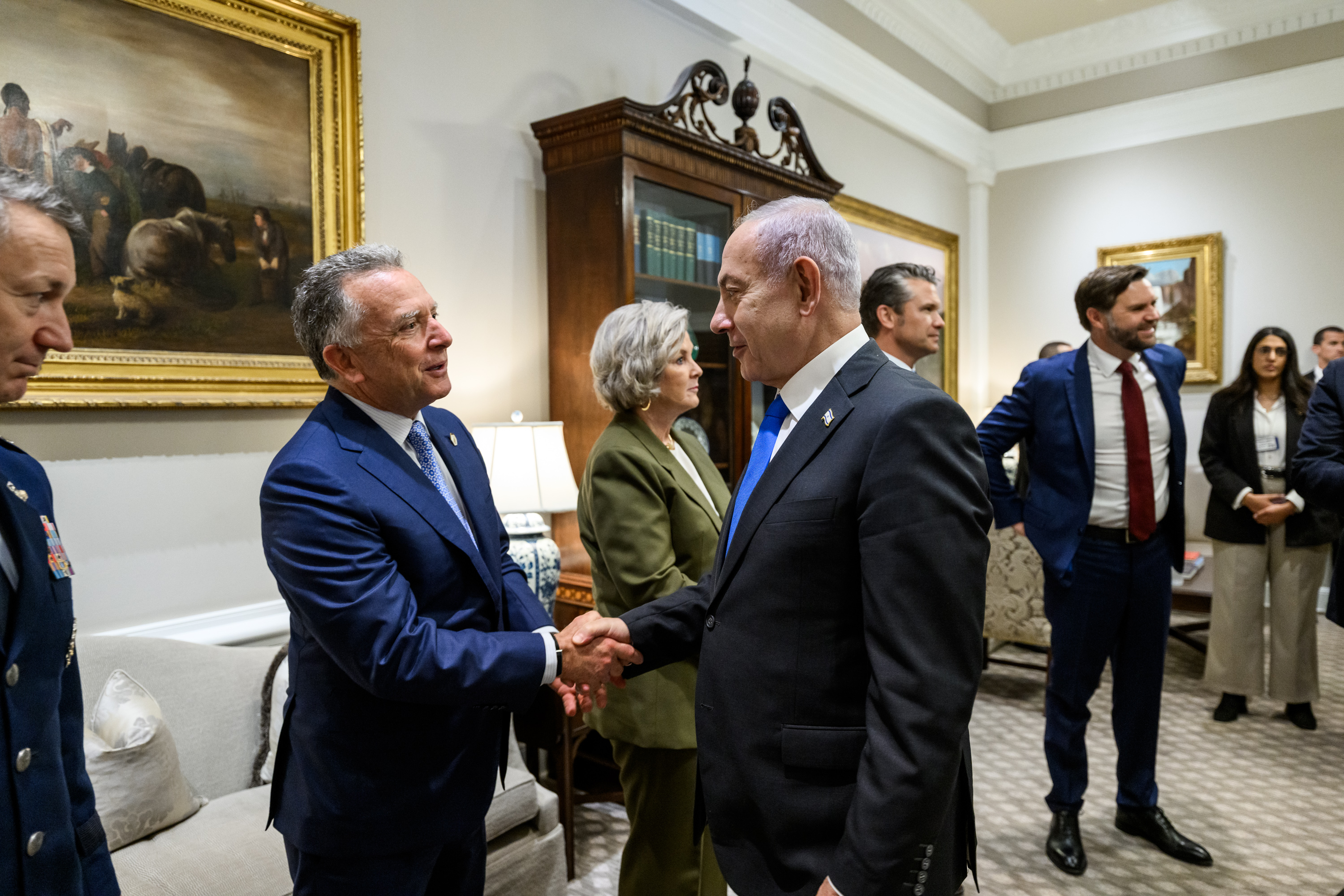
Witkoff with Israeli Prime Minister Benjamin Netanyahu at the White House, September 29, 2025

In 2024, Witkoff criticized the Biden administration over its decision to halt the shipment of certain bombs to Israel. However, he also stated that Hamas members are "not as ideologically extreme as they are portrayed" and praised Qatar for its efforts in trying to negotiate an end to the Gaza conflict.

In March 2025, Witkoff said that Israeli Prime Minister Benjamin Netanyahu, by renewing attacks on Gaza, was prioritizing the destruction of Hamas over the release of Israeli hostages.

=== Russia and Ukraine ===
Witkoff with Russian President Vladimir Putin at the Moscow Kremlin, September 5, 2026

In 2018, Witkoff opposed sanctions against Russia for its occupation of Crimea.

Witkoff has praised Russian president Putin and has appeared to support Russian government claims about its war against Ukraine. He said that Russia's invasion of Ukraine was "not necessarily" started by Russia, that NATO had a significant role in provoking the conflict, and that most Eastern Ukrainians want to live under Russian rule.

Witkoff said he is certain that Putin is not going to invade Europe and is not interested in the rest of Ukraine other than the annexed southeastern Ukraine.

Witkoff again praised Vladimir Putin during October 2026 talks, stating Putin to be a "humanitarian".

=== Iran's nuclear program ===
Diplomats with knowledge of the Iran talks said Witkoff undermined the negotiations by misrepresenting a key exchange. He has stated that Iran should abandon its nuclear enrichment program as part of an agreement. As special envoy, he was the chief negotiator with Iran during the April–May 2025 talks.

== Personal life ==
In 1987, Witkoff married Lauren Jill Rappoport, who was then an associate at the Manhattan law firm of Botein, Hays & Sklar. In 2011, their 22-year-old son Andrew died of an OxyContin overdose at the now-closed Sunset Plaza Drive sober living facility in California. Their son Zachary is a co-founder of World Liberty Financial, a cryptocurrency company. Their son Alex is co-CEO of the Witkoff Group.

In 2019, Witkoff relocated from New York City to Florida and settled in Miami Beach. He separated from his wife, Jill, and has been in a relationship with Lauren Olaya since 2024; she often accompanies him.

The Witkoff family also owns a farm in Lexington, Kentucky, which was reported to be the location for a fundraiser in October 2025 for Nate Morris alongside Vivek Ramaswamy.

In 2024, Bloomberg reported that Witkoff backed a $25 million expansion of Miami's Institute of Contemporary Art. That year, he was appointed to the museum's board of trustees. Witkoff has been on the executive committee for the Real Estate Board of New York and is a trustee for the Intrepid Foundation, and on the board of trustees of Hofstra University since 2015.

=== Advocacy ===
After the death of his son, Andrew, from an opioid overdose in 2011, Witkoff has become an advocate for addiction awareness and recovery efforts, addressing the issue in his speech at the 2024 Republican National Convention.
