= Zach Witkoff =

American businessman

- Witkoff in 2026
- Born: May 21, 1993 (age 33)
- Education: University of Miami (BBA)
- Known for: World Liberty Financial
- Spouse: Sophi Knight (m. 2022)
- Children: 1
- Relatives: Steve Witkoff (father); Alex Witkoff (brother)

Zach Witkoff (born May 21, 1993) is an American businessman who co-founded World Liberty Financial (WLF), a cryptocurrency firm co-owned by the Donald Trump family. WLF has stirred controversy for multiple conflicts of interest controversies in relation to the Trump family.

== Early life and education ==
Witkoff is the son of real estate investor and lawyer Steve Witkoff and lawyer Lauren Rappoport. He holds a degree in business administration from the University of Miami's Herbert Business School.

== Career ==
After graduating, Witkoff served as a project manager at his father's real estate firm, the Witkoff Group, before co-leading the family's private investment vehicle, Witkoff Capital.

He co-founded World Liberty Financial (WLF), in 2024. The firm established the stablecoin USD1, pegged to the United States Dollar.

Several media reports have raised concerns about potential conflicts of interest involving WLFI. The Guardian noted that Zach Witkoff’s father, Steve Witkoff, who has served as a Middle East special envoy under President Donald Trump, has business links to WLFI, prompting questions about overlap between his public role and private interests. In May 2025, WLFI received a reported US$2 billion investment from a state-backed Abu Dhabi entity through its stablecoin product, which advocacy groups said could raise influence or ethics concerns given Steve Witkoff’s diplomatic responsibilities in the region.

In 2025, a firm associated with the Abu Dhabi government purchased $2 billion worth of USD1 stablecoins from World Liberty and secretly bought a 49% stake in the company for half a billion dollars; shortly hereafter, the Trump administration approved a plan to give the UAE firm hundreds of thousands of advanced, scarce computer chips, despite national security concerns.

== Personal life ==
In 2022, Witkoff married model Sophi Knight at a ceremony at Mar-a-Lago, attended by Donald Trump and Ron DeSantis. They have a son, Don James Witkoff. Also in 2022, Zach Witkoff was arrested and charged with felony cocaine possession, and misdemeanor disorderly conduct and resisting arrest after his father Steve Witkoff was denied entry to E11EVEN nightclub in Miami. In October 2025, Witkoff was the host of a fundraiser for U.S. Senate candidate Nate Morris in Kentucky alongside Vivek Ramaswamy.
