= Corruption allegations during the second Trump presidency =

Trump's second presidency has faced unprecedented conflicts of interest, self-enrichment, and allegations of corruption unrivaled in American history from historians, legal experts, and federal judges. (Note: Numerous sources and Trump's financial disclosures have attested to Trump's unprecedented self-enrichment and conflicts of interest, referred to it as corruption, and described it as unprecedented in American history.)

His administration has faced widespread allegations of insider trading and raised conflict of interest concerns due to business dealings by Trump's son-in-law Jared Kushner and his cabinet. Trump's grants of pardons and clemency have favored political allies and loyalists, with several given after millions in donations or fees. Trump has proactively solicited donations from companies and individuals following which favorable regulatory actions and decisions have occurred. Trump has maintained an active stock market account with thousands of trades totaling hundreds of millions of dollars. Trump has directly benefited by soliciting his own memecoin $TRUMP and benefitted from his family's cryptocurrency company World Liberty Financial which has received investments by anonymous individuals and foreign governments. As of his July 2026 financial report, Trump made over $2.2B in 2025 compared to $622M in 2024, of which $1.4B came from his family's cryptocurrency business. Trump has received an unusually large number of expensive gifts, such as a $400M jet from Qatar or gold bars, which some scholars view as a violation of the emoluments clause of the Constitution.

Trump's second term has been described by political commentators as having fewer prohibitions on business activity and guardrails against potential conflicts of interest than his first, and for having more opportunities to directly influence Trump. Trump repealed and rolled back anti-corruption measures and ethical standards for himself and his allies, dropped corruption charges against political figures with ties to him, and fired inspectors general investigating fraud and abuse. The New York Times described Trump as making up statistics "out of thin air", and for accusing government agencies and "anyone he disfavors of corruption and even criminality without proof". His second presidency was described as breaking with decades of ethical norms, and raising substantial corruption concerns. Congressional Republicans have largely downplayed or ignored the concerns.

Federal judges found many of the administration's actions to be illegal and unconstitutional, and by mid-July, a Washington Post analysis found he defied judges and the courts in roughly one third of all cases against him, actions which were described by legal experts as unprecedented for any presidential administration. His defiance of court orders and a claimed right to disobey the courts raised fears among legal experts of a constitutional crisis. An August 2026 Reuters/Ipsos poll found a majority of Americans believe that Trump and his family "have inappropriately profited from cryptocurrency since his return to power and that his policy decisions are influenced by his private business dealings".

== Background ==
Donald Trump is often described by historians as corrupt, with numerous scandals during his presidency, including the Trump–Ukraine scandal which resulted in the first impeachment of Donald Trump. After losing the 2020 United States presidential election, Trump claimed, without evidence, voter fraud and used his position in the government in an attempt to overturn the election, culminating in the January 6 United States Capitol attack which failed to overturn the election. The Supreme Court dismissed lawsuits against Trump when he left office, choosing not to rule on whether he violated laws around corruption or self-dealing.

== Pardons and commutations ==
As of November 2025 Trump had issued nearly two thousand pardons and commutations including for some prosecuted during his first presidency. His grant of pardons outpaced those of prior presidents. Trump's pardons and grants of clemency favored political allies and loyalists. Lobbyists have told the Wall Street Journal and other news outlets that fees of $1M are standard. Some would-be pardon recipients have offered success fees of $6M for a successful application.

Trump frequently bypassed the Office of the Pardon Attorney, and on March 7, 2025, fired its leader, Department of Justice career attorney Liz Oyer, and installed political loyalist Ed Martin in the role. Ed Martin described the rationale for granting pardons as "No MAGA left behind". In April 2025, Oyer testified to the Senate and accused the Justice Department of "ongoing corruption" and that "the leadership of the Department of Justice appears to value political loyalty above the fair and responsible administration of justice". In 2025, Trump pardoned 42 people charged with white-collar crimes. As of late January 2026, he had pardoned an additional 10 white collar criminals. In April 2026, The Wall Street Journal reported that Trump "repeatedly promised his top administration officials pardons before he leaves office". In June 2026, a Reuters investigation found 96% of clemency grants failed to meet longstanding Department of Justice guidelines for such requests, that they were based on partisan and personal criteria, and that there was evidence of payments being used to solicit them.

Trump was the first president in modern American history to issue pardons for businesses, and by July 2026 had issued nine and wiped out $200 million in penalties, some of which was destined for victims of wrongdoing. Bloomberg highlighted the case of HDR Global Trading, which owned crypto platform BitMEX and was the first company pardoned instead of a natural person. On January 15, 2025, BitMEX was fined $100 million for violating anti-money laundering laws after pleading guilty in July 2024. That month, the exchange launched a swap listing tied to the $TRUMP memecoin and its founder penned an essay which Bloomberg described as "framing the president's embrace of meme coins as a move toward bolstering political accountability". On March 27, 2025, Trump signed pardons for four BitMEX executives and pardoned the company the same week the $100 million fine was due.

== Gifts ==
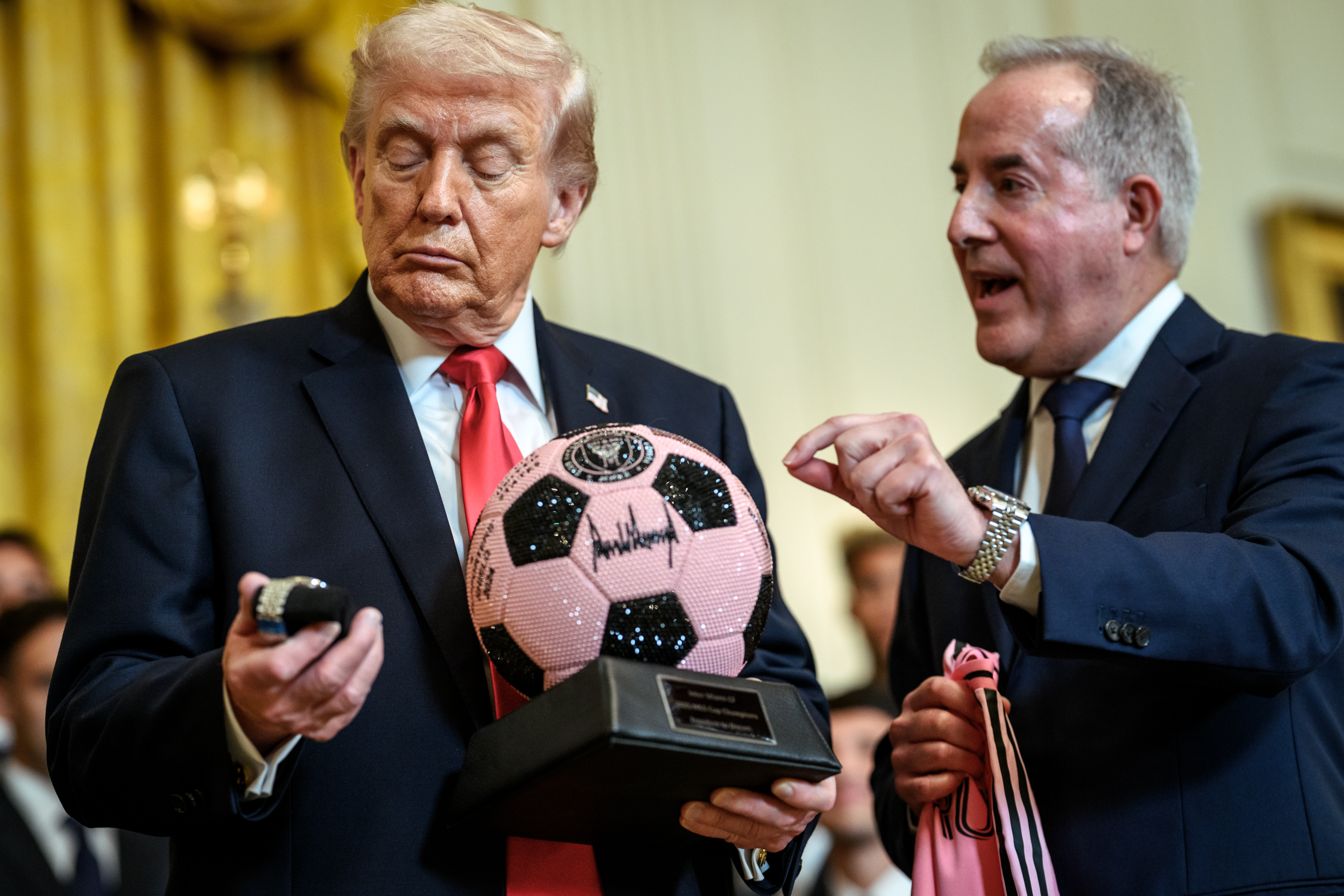
Trump receiving a $6,000 Tudor Black Bay Chrono "Pink" chronograph and other gifts during a visit of Inter Miami at the White House

During his time in office, Trump has received an unusually large number of expensive gifts that some scholars viewed as a violation of the emoluments clause of the Constitution. The donation of a 1-kilogram gold bar worth $130,000 and a Rolex desktop clock by Swiss business leaders received scrutiny owing to a reduction of Swiss tariffs from 39% to 15% ten days later. In July 2026, media reported that Trump accepted a "lavishly encrusted ring" with "321 diamonds, 56 sapphires, 13 emeralds and six rubies" from a Belgian diamond group months after Trump removed tariffs on Belgian diamond imports.

The gift of a $400 million jumbo jet from Qatar to be used as Air Force One and potentially for post-presidential travel raised substantial bipartisan ethical concerns and allegations of bribery. Following the initial announcement in May 2025, Trump's intention to accept the jet elicited rare, bipartisan criticism, even from longtime supporters who derided it as "corruption". The Guardian criticized it as an example of a quid pro quo. The Boston Globe described the deal as an example of a transactional presidency, describing it as more direct than during his first term and showed he was "willing to bend for anyone who gives him what he craves: praise, prestige, and a cut of the profits".

== Solicitation of donations ==
The Wall Street Journal reported that Trump ran an "unprecedented" fundraising operation and had collected "well over half a billion dollars from wealthy donors and stashing it in a sprawling network of nonprofits, cultural institutions and committees that he and his allies control". It wrote that companies "seeking lucrative contracts or favorable policies from the administration have poured millions of dollars into these funds" and that many of the donations were "shrouded in secrecy". Trump ran this operation through his fundraiser Meredith O'Rourke. According to the Journal:

Trump asks O'Rourke which companies and donors have cut checks and which haven't, and for how much. He often asks her to make much larger financial requests than she was planning—for some donors the ask is $5 million, for others it is $50 million. And the president gives her names to call, often including people who have recently met with him, according to people with knowledge of the calls.

According to the Journal, O'Rourke has "persistently" called companies stating that "This is very important to the president" and that "He's asked me to call you and ask you for this donation". The Journal stated that in "some calls, she has referred to Trump as the boss", and said that "the boss wants this money". It further stated that according to people who heard his comments, Trump nicknamed O'Rourke the "princess of darkness" because she was such a "killer" with donors.

You've been so generous in your contributions, very substantial money, fully financed. It's fully taken care of now. And in fact, we'll have money left over and we'll use that for something.

— Trump at an October 2025 dinner for White House State Ballroom donors.

According to the Journal, Trump made over $800M in solicited donations by July 2026 to be used in a variety of pet projects. These included SoftBank donating $50M to his presidential library; $25M from Apple, $10M from Microsoft and $5M from Amazon for his White House State Ballroom; $10M from Meta Platforms for the Trump-aligned political committee Securing American Greatness in addition to a multimillion donation to the ballroom and $22M for the presidential library; millions from Chevron after he asked for $50M; and over $100M from Timothy Mellon, some of which was given in the form of solid gold.

A 2025 New York Times investigation "traced" over half a billion dollars to 346 donors who each gave at least $250,000. Of the 346 donors, "more than half of them have benefited, or are involved in an industry that has benefited, from the actions or statements" of the administration including "pardons, favorable regulatory moves, the dropping of legal cases, access to the president and more". The investigation looked at "a buffet of options (...) presented to donors" including the inaugural committee, Trust for the National Mall, White House State Ballroom, White House Historical Association, America250, Securing American Greatness, Kennedy Center, National Park Foundation (Freedom 250). Unlike MAGA Inc. and the Republican National Committee, donations to the "buffet" do not require disclosure to the Federal Election Commission. 32 people in the administration, themselves, their families or their companies, donated at least $250,000 to Trump's "causes after the election". It wrote that "Since retaking office, the president has lavished his post-election donors with praise and access to himself and his inner circle" and that "The White House has used government platforms to praise major donors to a wider audience."

After taking in $5M worth of donations to his political committee from tobacco companies, Trump met with them in May 2025 and afterwards the FDA lifted restrictions on flavored vaping products and the FDA chief was removed. After Lockheed Martin gave $10M in late 2025 and early 2026, the Pentagon "awarded Lockheed a contract worth up to $35 billion", and Trump later announced it agreed to pay $5M to a new White House helipad. Trump raised $50M from donors towards his Freedom 250 organization. The Journal interviewed multiple current and former administration officials who variously described the scheme as a "shakedown" and transactional, noting that Trump would frequently ask how much money companies had given if they approached him for help, and that several "CEOs and board members said they believe there is a link between their contributions and their access to the president". It highlighted candlelight dinners, exclusive events, and access to his Mar-a-Lago resort as benefits of donating. It reported that Trump would ask donors "What can I do to help you" and "What do you need" at events.

=== "Pay-for-access" and MAGA Inc. ===
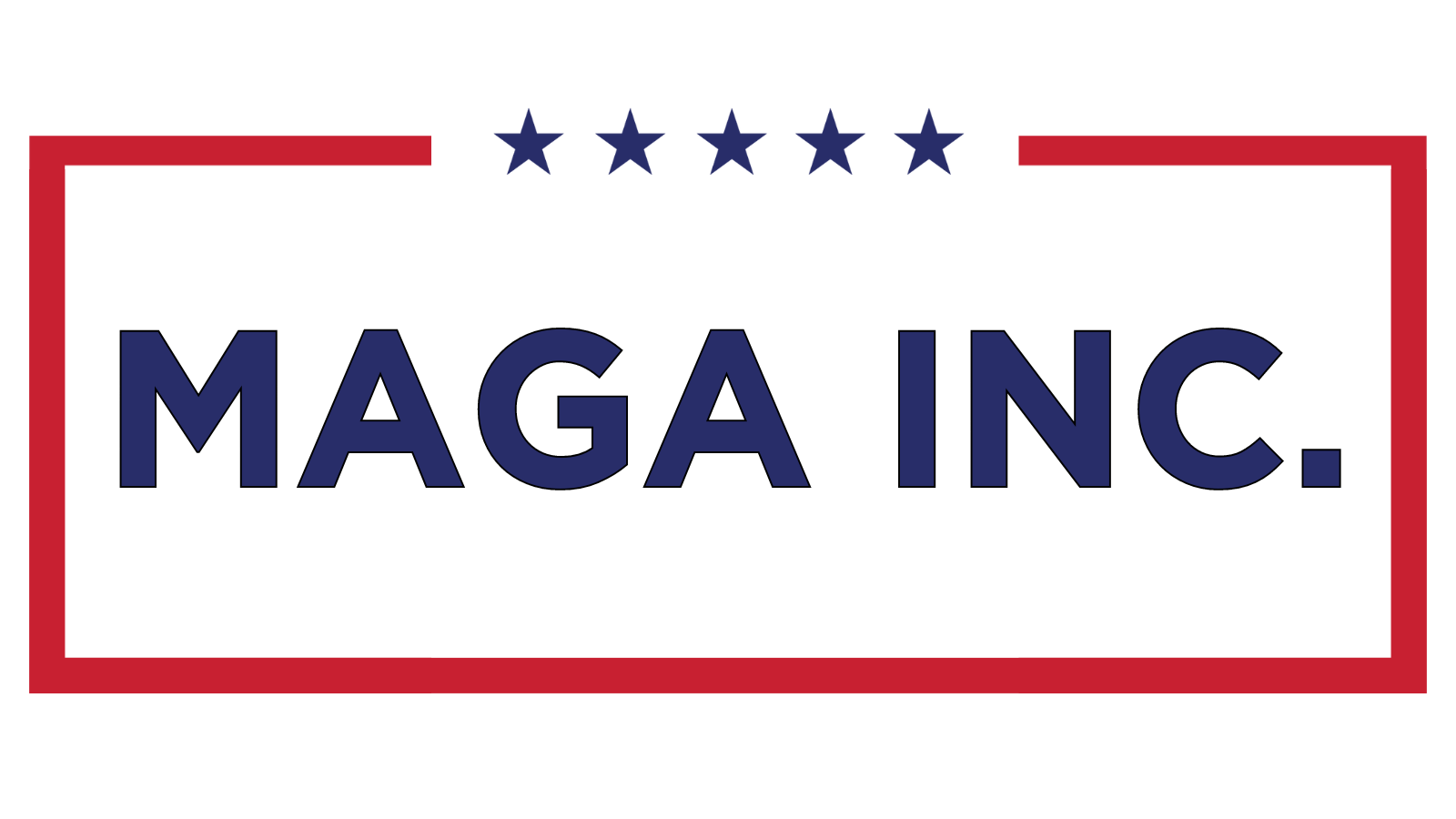
MAGA Inc. logo

Trump has maintained what The New York Times described as a "pay-for-access" operation, with millions being raised for his pro-Trump PAC, Make America Great Again Inc., which had collected $177 million in the first half of 2025, twice as much as was raised by the Republican National Committee and unusually large for term-limited presidents. Millions were raised from individuals, lobbyists, corporations, and donors to it and other Trump-friendly outlets. Those that gave were granted access to the president and shortly afterward several received presidential pardons, favorable regulatory and policy actions, or appointments for government positions.

Examples of criticism included but were not limited to the Trump administration lifting a ban on Central Romana Corporation shipping sugar to the United States following allegations of forced labor at the company. According to OpenSecrets, Fanjul Corp, which owns Central Romana, had given $1 million to MAGA Inc. Another action criticized was the pardon of Paul Walczak following his mother's attendance at a $1 million per person fund raising "candlelight dinner" sponsored by MAGA Inc. Walczak was alleged by prosecutors to have withheld over $10 million from paychecks of staff at a nursing home for trust fund taxes instead using the money to buy a $2 million yacht among other expenses. Walczak was supposed to pay $4.3 million in restitution prior to his pardon. The Trump administration was also criticized for delaying a rule change which would restrict coverage of skin substitutes under Medicare after Extremity Care "a leading seller of skin substitutes" gave $5 million to MAGA Inc. Following lobbying from the nursing home industry, including "nearly $4.8 million to MAGA Inc.", the administration revoked a policy change to increase staffing in nursing homes.

== Insider trading allegations ==
A number of financial analysts have identified significant signs of insider trading in the U.S. government during the second presidency of Donald Trump. Allegations of insider trading have focused on U.S. officials, anonymous accounts on prediction markets with suspiciously high win rates, as well as Trump and his family.

While previous presidents have employed blind trusts or otherwise refrained from trading while in office, Trump has made billions of dollars from security trades since 2025. He has bought stocks of multiple companies that have been impacted by his decisions as president, and publicly promoted companies whose stocks he had bought. Trump said in June 2026 that his children have had "inside information" while trading stocks impacted by his presidential actions, and denied any illegal conduct. United States conflict-of-interest laws do not prohibit the president of the United States from "participating personally and substantially in a particular Government matter that will affect his own financial interests".

Prediction market platforms soared in popularity after Trump was elected for the second time, with many well-timed trades done mostly by newly-created and single-purpose accounts correctly predicting actions by the executive branch of the United States shortly before they happened. Accounts suspected of insider trading have on multiple occasions bet on events such as the 2026 Iran War and tariffs decisions of Trump.

== Conflicts of interest ==
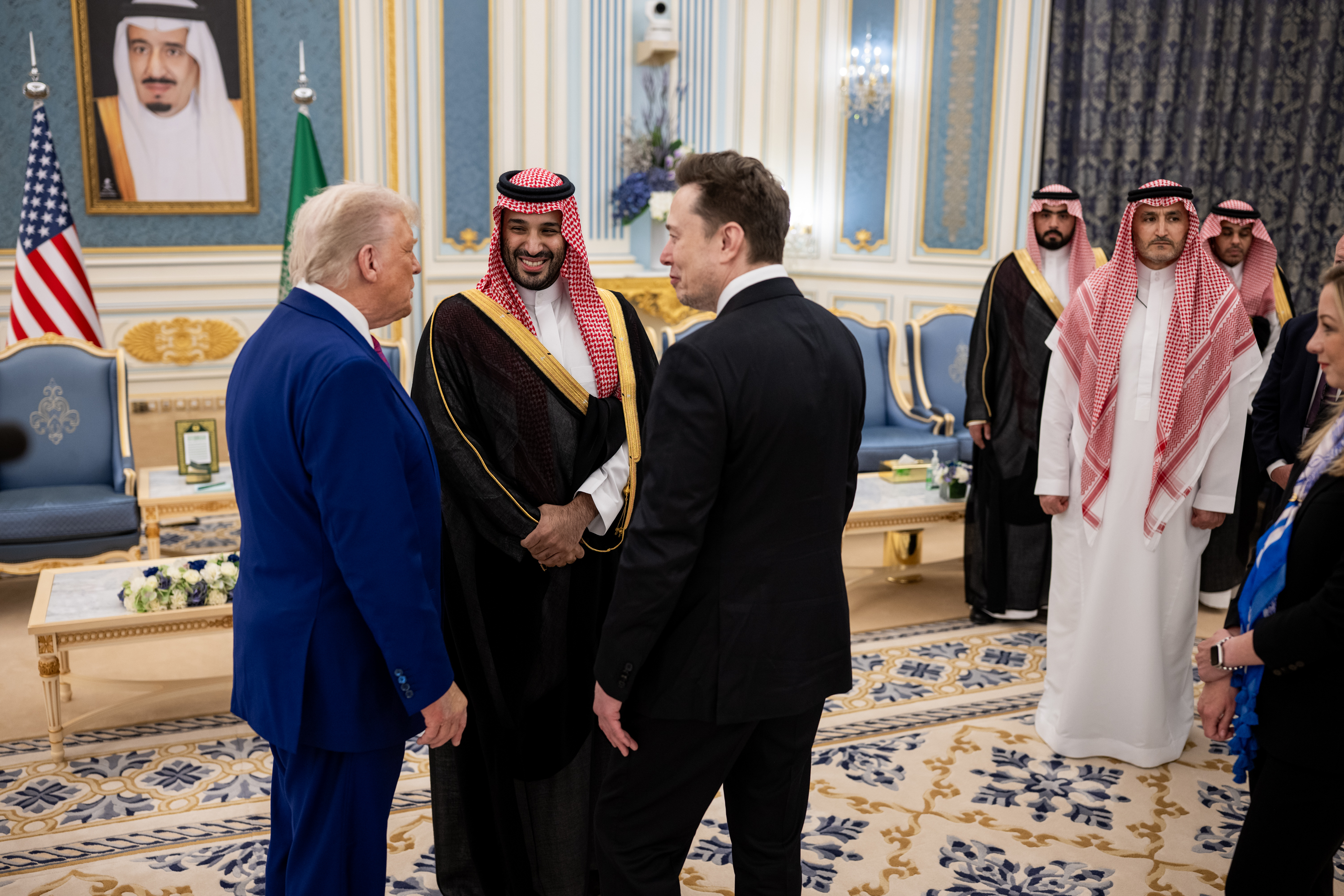
Trump with Elon Musk and Saudi crown prince Mohammed bin Salman during Trump's visit to the Middle East in May 2025

Avatar of Donald J. Trump

Donald J. Trump
(@realDonaldTrump)
tweeted:

English:

I am pleased to report that I have raised, since the Great Presidential Election of 2024, in various forms and political entities, in excess of 1.5 Billion Dollars. MAKE AMERICA GREAT AGAIN!!! President DJT

August 26, 2025

Trump's second presidency has included potential conflicts of interest that did not exist during his first term, including a publicly traded company in Truth Social, a cryptocurrency venture, new overseas real estate deals involving state-affiliated entities, and branding and licensing deals selling Trump-branded merchandise. In August 2026, CNBC reported Trump's foreign licensing business had made more than $59.5M, up 71% from 2024 and nearly tenfold from 2023, and many came from companies "seeking U.S. investments, government approvals or favorable relations". His 2024 campaign was noted for an "unprecedented" mixing of personal business and political fundraising. Trump promoted $59.99 bibles, $399 sneakers, $99 "Victory47" cologne, and $99 Trump-branded NFT digital trading cards for his personal, non-campaign accounts. Trump's campaign was noted for spending large sums of campaign money at Trump-owned businesses, in particular his Mar-a-Lago resort and the Trump National Doral Miami. When asked why he made deals with companies while in office despite conflict of interest concerns, Trump stated it is "Because I found out that nobody cared" and denied allegations of corruption.

After winning the election, Trump mirrored his first term's ethics commitments and did not divest from his interests in branding and real estate. He did not place his assets in a trust managed by an independent trustee. Trump did not adopt his own formal ethics guidelines. Trump transferred his shares of Truth Social into a trust in which he is the sole beneficiary, of which his oldest son is the trustee. Ethics experts described it as falling "well short of the blind trusts and divestitures from private business interests that other presidents have used to avoid ethical conflicts with their job". The White House has asserted that there are no conflicts of interest from his family company's investments as Trump is not involved in their daily operations, saying criticism was a result of "years of lies and false accusations against him and his businesses from the fake news media". The New York Times reported that Trump's sons legally control the trusts that collect the revenue from business operations, but Trump is still listed as a beneficiary of the trusts, and thus he profits directly from the deals.

Trump profited from holding events at his hotels and golf courses. He made an unprecedented amount of stock trades, totaling hundreds of millions of dollars across thousands of transactions in companies with extensive business dealings before the federal government. He promoted companies on social media days after buying their stocks. Trump noted that conflict of interest laws did not apply to him and that he was protected by broad immunity for his official actions.

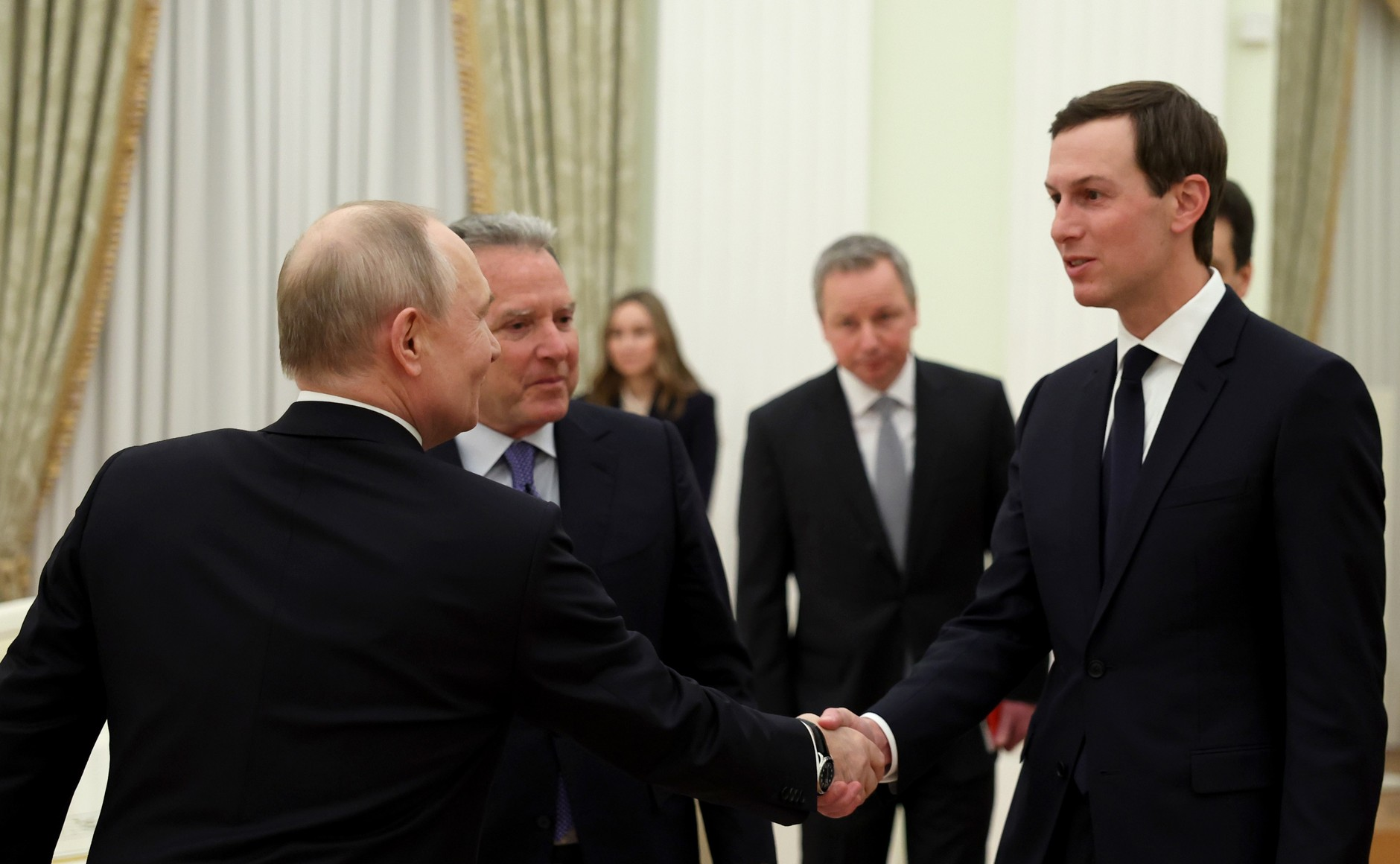
Jared Kushner and Steve Witkoff at the Kremlin in January 2026

Trump's son-in-law Jared Kushner, a private citizen, represented the administration while simultaneously seeking foreign investment for his company Affinity Partners. The New York Times described Kushner and Steve Witkoff (members of Trump's "Board of Peace") as "businessmen first and diplomats second." Kushner said to 60 Minutes, "what people call conflicts of interests, Steve and I call experience and trusted relationships."

Trump's conflicts of interest were described as having national-security risks, with particular emphasis placed on relationships with the Saudi and Emirati governments through the Trump Organization and his Kushner's investment fund backed by the Saudis. Trump's son, Eric Trump, said the Trump Organization would continue to pursue business deals overseas, dropping a self-imposed prohibition during Trump's first presidency. In 2026, Kushner's investment in a luxury resort in Albania caused widespread protests dubbed the "Flamingo Revolution" from locals opposed to the project and perceived corruption within the country and how the deal was made. His sons made large "investments in military contractors, or predictions market companies or companies pursuing billions of dollars of federal assistance", and Kusher's investment firm solicited funds from Middle Eastern governments while also working as an envoy having direct and indirect dealings with those governments in his role in the second Trump administration. According to reporting by Bloomberg News, investors in the firm do so with the expectation of influencing the Trump administration. On 22 September 2026, Republican Senator John Curtis requested that the Senate Judiciary Committee investigate the business activities of President Trump's family, focusing especially on his oldest son, Donald Trump Jr. Curtis referred to reports about a Russian oligarch paying for wedding celebrations for Trump Jr. and raised questions about his business activities in areas such as cryptocurrency, real estate, and prediction-market platforms. Senate Judiciary Committee Chairman Chuck Grassley said he would review the request, while the committee's top Democrat, Dick Durbin, also expressed support for it. The Trump family has defended its business practices and denied any conflicts of interest.

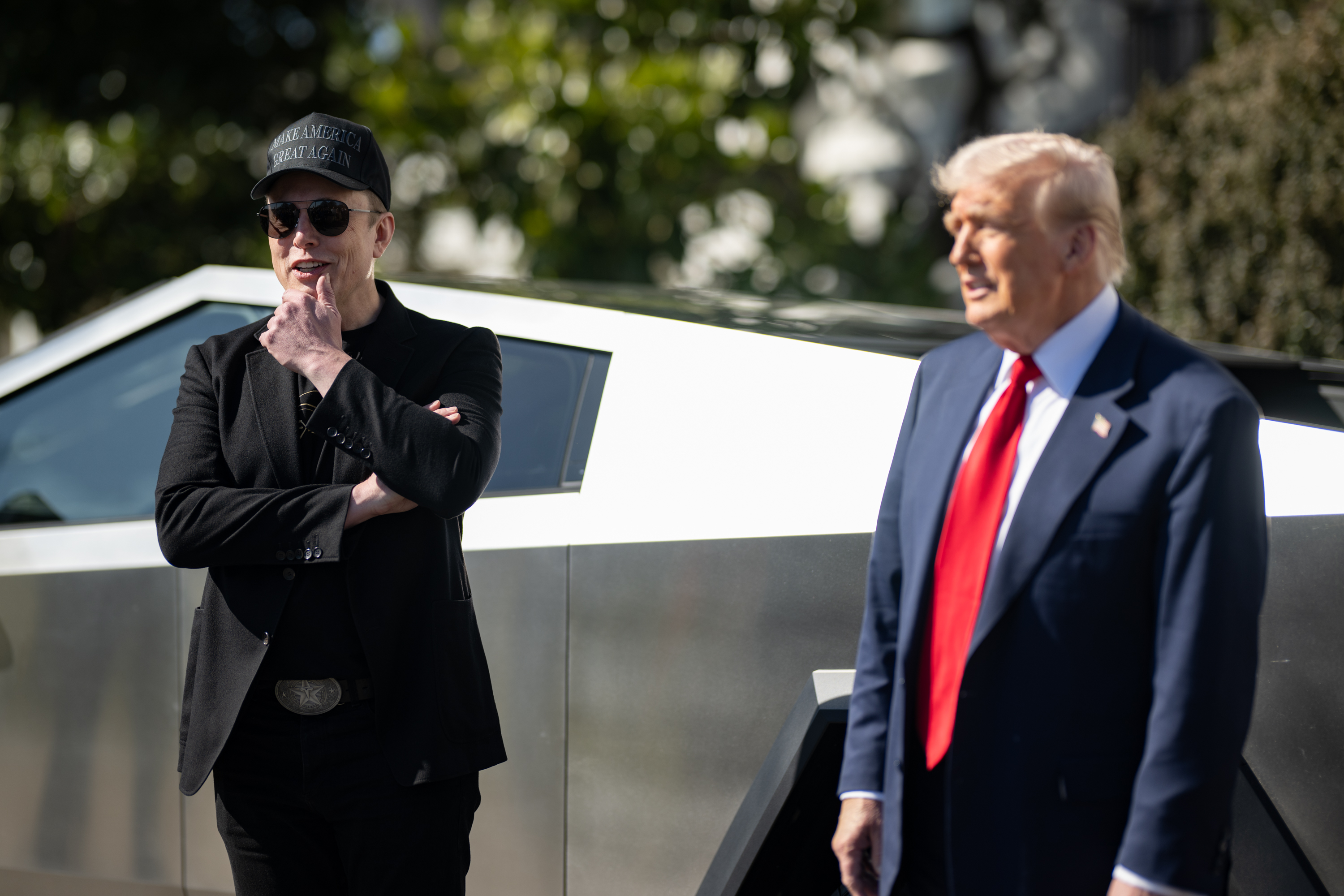
On March 11, 2025, Trump and Elon Musk promoted Tesla vehicles on the White House south lawn.

As part of the Initial Rescissions of Harmful Executive Orders and Actions, Trump repealed Ethic Commitments by Executive Branch Personnel which prohibited executive branch employees accepting major gifts from lobbyists and two year bans on lobbyists seeking executive jobs and vice versa. Critics described the repeal as the opposite of his pledge to "drain the swamp". Trump signed Executive Order 14209 to stop the Justice Department prosecuting Americans accused of bribing foreign government officials under the Foreign Corrupt Practices Act. Trump's wife, Melania, entered into a deal with Amazon to create Melania, a documentary about herself, which raised ethics concerns as it was made while she was still in office. In 2025, Trump praised Tesla's cars on the White House lawn with notes about the cars' features alongside Elon Musk in "something of a sales pitch" which was described in The Nation as "brazenly corrupt". Countries facing tariffs were pushed by the State Department to approve Musk's Starlink satellite service.

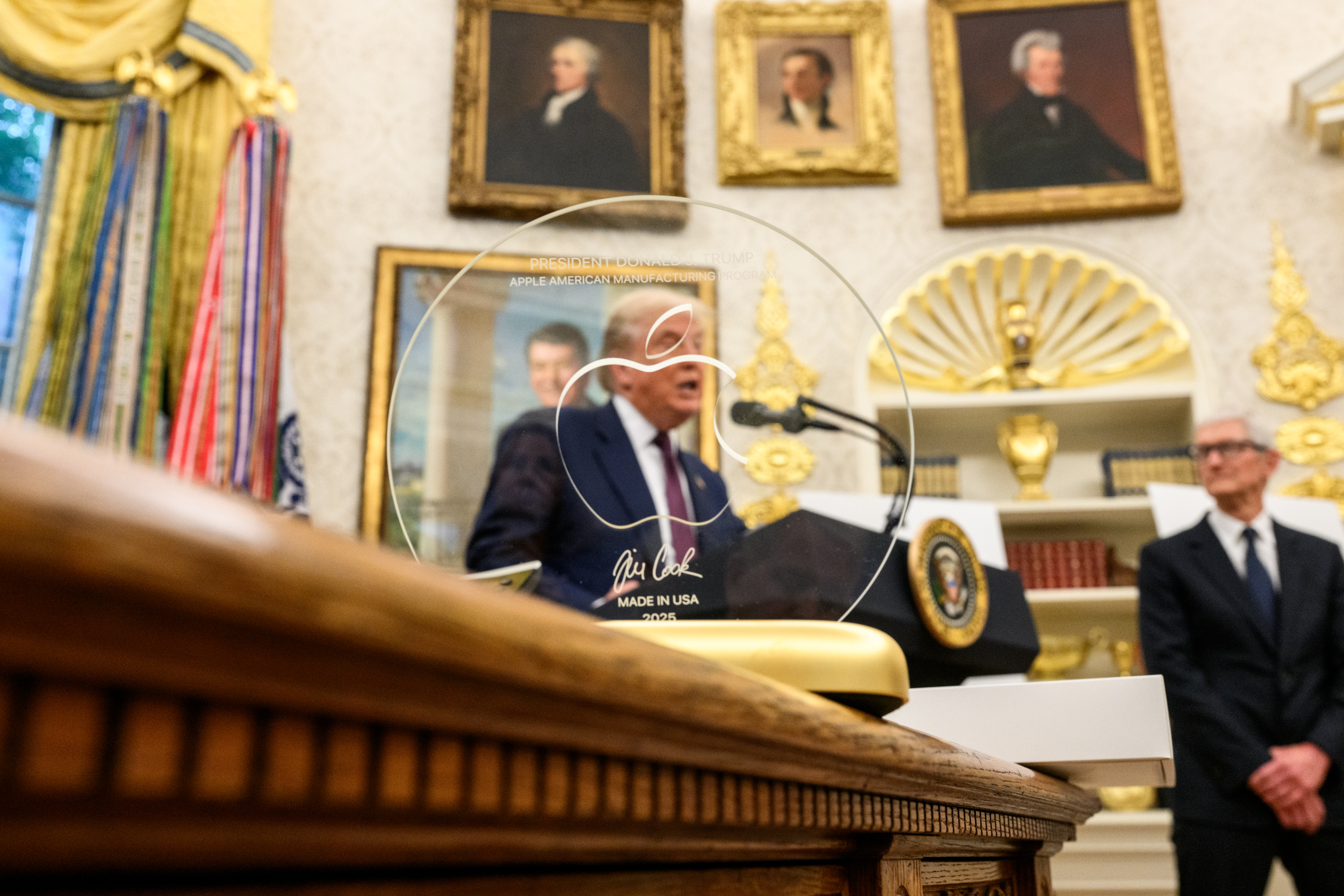
Apple Inc. CEO Tim Cook and Donald Trump in the oval office with a gold gift to the president in the foreground at the announcement of a $100 billion "investment" in the US

On April 9, 2025, Trump's encouragement of investors to buy stocks hours before pausing tariffs that sent markets soaring was scrutinized by Democrats and government ethics experts as possible market manipulation. Representative Adam Schiff called on Congress to investigate whether in pausing tariffs, Trump had engaged in insider trading or market manipulation. 14 months later, Trump disclosed 327 unreported stock trades the day before his announcement he would pause some of his Liberation Day tariffs. His use of tariff exemptions also raised concerns of corruption, with claims of insider trading and special exemptions being given to friends and to punish rivals. Trump has suggested those who "invest" within the United States would be able to reduce their tariffs.

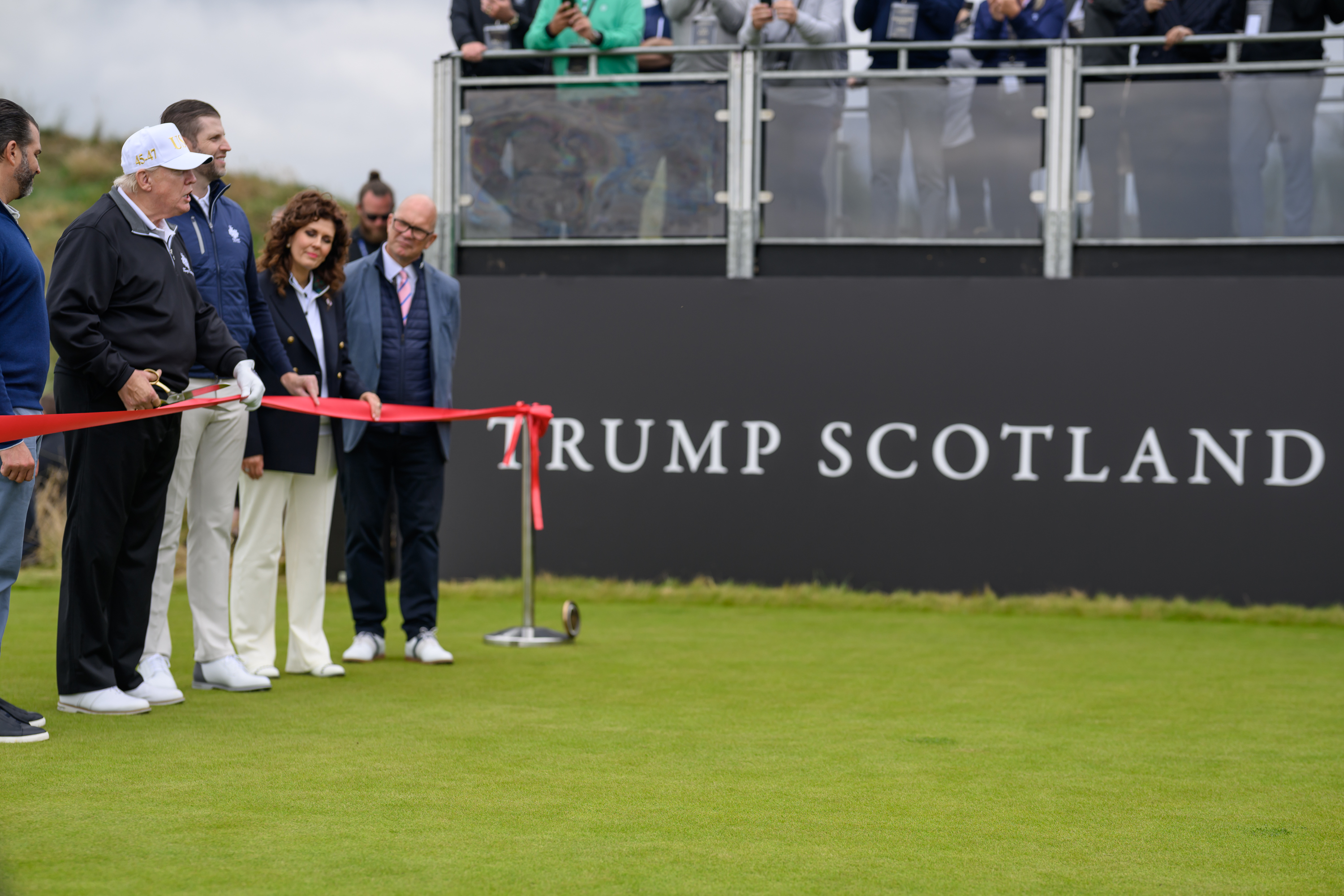
Trump participates in the grand opening ceremony of Trump International Golf Links Aberdeen in July 2025.

By August 2025, the United States Office of Government Ethics reported that Trump had made 690 stock transactions since taking office, including purchasing $100 million in bonds from local authorities, gas districts, and major American corporations. CNBC reported that federal law exempted the president and vice president from some conflict of interest regulations.

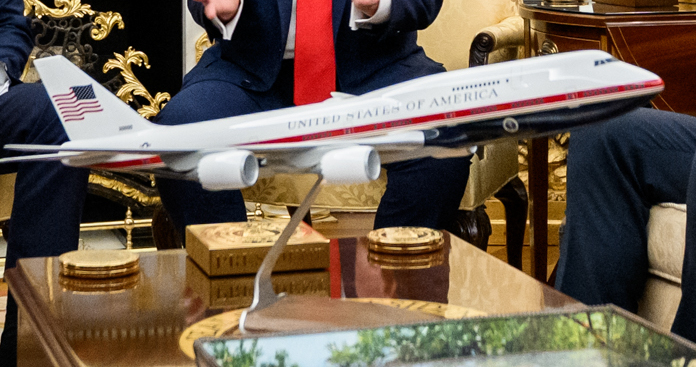
New Air Force One model

An August 2025 New Yorker Piece entitled "The Number" by David D. Kirkpatrick estimated that Trump had gained over $3 billion from the presidency. This was calculated from increased business at Mar-a-Lago, legal fees, TrumpStore.com, deals with the Arab states of the Persian Gulf, N7478D, Trump International, Vietnam, Trump's conflict with the media, the Trump Media & Technology Group, 1789 Capital and cryptocurrency.

Trump's cabinet were noted to have many potential conflicts of interest, with the Campaign Legal Center finding over 467 that would require recusal, with the most, 106, belonging to Howard Lutnick. Trump Media gifted 25,946 shares of stock of DJT to each of his picks for FBI director, Kash Patel, and education secretary nominee, Linda McMahon, totaling $779,400 each as of January 31, 2025. Both members served as directors for his company, and they later said they would not accept the award. He gifted thousands of shares to his son.

At the 2025 Gaza peace summit, a microphone recorded Indonesian president Prabowo Subianto asking Trump if he could meet his son, Eric. Trump replied he would have Eric call him, leading to speculation over the involvement of The Trump Organization. At the time, Eric Trump served as an executive vice president of The Trump Organization, which had business interests in Indonesia, including a golf club near Jakarta and a planned resort in Bali. Prabowo had told Trump that he had also informed Hary, reportedly referring to Hary Tanoesoedibjo, an Indonesian developer with ties to the Trump Organization. Tony Carrk, executive director of the watchdog group Accountable.US, stated that the exchange showed "there is no line between Trump presidential and personal business."

In October 2025, Trump demanded the Justice Department pay him $230 million to compensate him for his former federal investigations. The move was described as unparalleled and the starkest example of a conflict of interest due to the president's installing his personal lawyers as leaders of the department.

A Flamingo Revolution protest in Tirana on 14 June 2026 against the Albanian government's approval of Jared Kushner's luxury real estate projects in the Vjosa-Narta nature reserve

The Justice Department reportedly shut down an anti-bribery investigation into Tom Homan after he accepted a $50,000 "bag of cash" from federal agents.

In October 2025, Trump said that an anonymous private donor has given $130 million to the U.S. government to help pay troops during the government shutdown. While Trump refused to identify the donor, the donor was reported to be Timothy Mellon.

Of a $200 million ad campaign, $143 million reportedly was awarded to Safe America Media LLC with the national emergency designation used to bypass "the normal competitive bidding" procurement process. The LLC was incorporated eight days before the contract award with its address being the home of a Republican consultant. While, "subcontractors hired to do work on the DHS ads are not disclosed in federal contracting databases", a production as part of the contract was run by the Strategy Group. The group's CEO is Ben Yoho who is married to Tricia McLaughlin the assistant secretary for Public Affairs at DHS. USAspending.gov lists the Office of Public Affairs at DHS as the "Funding Office" of the award. Noem had previously required "that she personally approve any payment over $100,000". Noem had previously been accused of intervening as South Dakota governor "to ensure the Strategy Group got the deal". The group paid "up to $25,000" to Madison Sheahan described as "one of Noem's closest advisers in South Dakota". Yoho had also "worked under Lewandowski on the publicity campaign for Noem's 2024 memoir". Another firm, "People Who Think", owned by Jay Connaughton, has a $77 million award for advertising from DHS. In 2023, "Connaughton appeared to have worked" with Lewandowski.

The TRUMP VANCE INAUGURAL COMMITTEE, INC. received more than US$245 million.

David O. Sacks "stands out as a special government employee because of his hundreds of investments in tech companies, which can benefit from policies that he influences".

Trump will host the 2026 G20 summit at Trump National Doral Miami, a resort owned by The Trump Organization.

Following the 2026 United States intervention in Venezuela, Trump posted that Venezuelan oil "money will be controlled by me". The main bank account for the oil sells was located in Qatar.

Trump Media & Technology Group logo

Pam Bondi sold between $1–5m in Trump Media & Technology Group on April 2, 2025. The same day Trump announced Liberation Day tariffs.

Trump bought at least a million dollars in Netflix and Warner Bros. Discovery bonds. A proposed acquisition of Warner Bros. Discovery would need the administration's approval.

The Interior Department Associate Deputy Secretary, as of 2026, Karen Budd-Falen's husband Frank Falen entered into a deal with a subsidiary of Lithium Americas for $3.5 million. A year after the deal, during the first Trump presidency, Budd-Falen met with the subsidiary while Thacker Pass lithium mine was pending federal review.

Reuters reported that the "Office of Management and Budget, which Vought leads, is allocating $15 million of what remains of USAID operating expenses" for Russell Vought.

In May 2026, financial disclosure forms from the United States Office of Government Ethics revealed that Trump traded $220 million of stocks in the first three months of the year. Since Lyndon Johnson put his assets in a blind trust, every US president except Trump has done the same, or held assets in index funds and Treasuries. No president has traded in the stock market while in office until Trump's second term.

A proposed Trump Tower Tbilisi venture would involve The Trump Organization and the family of Bidzina Ivanishvili.

ProPublica reported that at the request of Peter Navarro, the pentagon loaned US$620 million to Vulcan Elements which is linked to Donald Trump Jr. According to ProPubica, "Of the dozens of companies the Pentagon was considering funding at the time, Vulcan's was the only deal initiated by a top aide to the president".

Addendum dated May 19, 2026

In January 2026, Trump sued the IRS and its parent, the US Treasury, for $10 billion for a leak of his tax returns. Since no sitting US president had ever before sued a government agency he controls, the lawsuit raised conflicts of interest and questions about whether the case could even proceed, with Judge Kathleen M. Williams writing that "it is unclear to this Court whether the Parties are sufficiently adverse to each other so as to satisfy Article III’s case or controversy requirement." Before those issues were resolved in court, Trump dropped the suit, and the Department of Justice, led by Todd Blanche, Trump's former personal attorney who was then the acting United States Attorney General, announced an out-of-court settlement of $1.8 billion to be distributed to what the administration referred to as victims of lawfare by the Biden administration. Blanche announced an addendum to the settlement which would grant immunity from IRS audits of all tax returns Trump, his family and his businesses had filed in the past. The New York Times reported that this additional settlement ended Trump's potential liability for a $73 million tax refund he claimed on all his income as the host of The Apprentice (2004–2017). Judge Kathleen M. Williams ruled the settlement was filed for an "improper purpose" and characterized it as an exercise in self-dealing, recommending attorney sanctions and disciplinary action for those involved.

In August 2026, The Washington Post reported that 15 companies in which Donald Trump's sons, Eric Trump and Donald Trump Jr., had investments had received a total of $3.2 billion in federal contracts, investments, and loans. According to the report, most of these deals took place after Trump returned to office. Following the report, Democratic lawmakers asked the Pentagon's inspector general to investigate contracts awarded to businesses linked to the brothers. The Trump Organization said that the brothers were passive minority investors and had no involvement in the companies' day-to-day operations or government contracts. The Pentagon said that no company had received preferential treatment.

Multiple news reports found multi-month long trends of stock market increases and oil price decreases in response to Trump's announcements of "positive news" about the 2026 Iran war, erasing oil price gains and stock market price losses; analysts allege that the patterns are of insider trading ahead of his Truth Social posts. Trump's repeated usage of oil price suppressions using his announcements have been considered an act of "jawboning" to purposefully suppress oil prices. Bloomberg News reported that the United States Commodity Futures Trading Commission (CFTC) was forced to withdraw retract referrals into the financial market trading patterns by the Trump-appointed chairman's senior advisor Mel Gunewardena.

In June 2026, The New York Times reported on $1.6B in federal financing for a mining operation in Kazakhstan which had a 20% stake by Trump's two eldest sons. In July, The New York Times first reported that a South Korean company paid Trump's holding company $2M while its aluminum firm, Korea Aluminium, fought a Commerce Department trade case. The company, Base Co. LTD, "had a years-long business relationship with the Trump family business, selling Trump-branded wine in South Korea".

In July 2026, Trump Media announced plans to sell Wall Street firms early access to Trump's "market moving" Truth Social posts. Kevin McGurn, intern boss of Trump Media, stated that "Markets already move on Truth Social posts". The BBC reported that "the president stands to profit directly from selling expedited access to his own public statements". According to Robert Frenchman from US law firm Dynamis, "a tech platform can tier its distribution of information without violating federal securities laws".

Trump gained the government equity stakes in major US corporations in an embrace of state capitalism, and demanded a share of profits for the government. Trump officials said the moves would help "strengthen critical industries", while critics said "the administration has sometimes extorted firms into giving it their shares, by holding out the threat of regulation that could help or hurt the company". As part of an agreement to allow Japan-based Nippon Steel to buy US Steel, Trump was granted a personal, not governmental, golden share in US Steel, allowing him to influence board decisions and maintain veto power over certain decisions set to expire at the end of his presidential term, after which the Treasury and Commerce Departments would exercise control under all future presidents.

== Cryptocurrency ventures ==
After a brief initial rise, the price of the $Trump meme coin declined. About 764,000 people who invested after the all time high (ATH) on 19 January 2025 lost money.

The Melania meme coin experienced extreme volatility in its first days, after which it declined in price.

The market price of World Liberty's WLFI token declined after becoming publicly traded, though a Trump business entity collected a 75% cut of WLFI sales despite its decline. Donald Trump's 2025 profits reached $799 million.

Most of Donald Trump's 2025 revenue was derived from his businesses' cryptocurrency ventures, an industry over which he exercised substantial regulatory influence.

Trump and his family involvement in the cryptocurrency industry have given rise to ethical and legal concerns.

On January 17, 2025, Trump launched, promoted, and personally benefited from a cryptocurrency memecoin, $Trump, that soared to a market valuation of over $5 billion within a few hours—a total $27 billion diluted value—through a Trump-owned company called CIC Digital LLC, which owned 80 percent of the coin's supply. Within two days, the $Trump coin became the 19th most valuable form of cryptocurrency in the world, with a total trading value of nearly $13 billion, and a total of $29 billion worth of trades based on a $64 value of each of the 200 million tokens issued by the afternoon of January 19. The New York Times reported that Trump affiliates controlled an additional 800 million tokens that, hypothetically, could be worth over $51 billion, potentially making Trump one of the richest people in the world. Trump also launched a new meme coin named after his wife, $Melania, and promoted it on Truth Social shortly before attending an inauguration rally. The crypto venture was criticized by ethics experts and government watchdogs. The venture and the possibility of foreign governments buying the coin was highlighted as possibly violating the Constitution's Foreign Emoluments Clause. He promoted exclusive access to him for the largest holders of $Trump, including hosting a dinner, which according to The New York Times, certain buyers in interviews and statements said they "bought the coins or entered the dinner contest with the intention of securing an action by Mr. Trump to affect United States policy".

He directly benefited from his cryptocurrency company World Liberty Financial which engaged in an unprecedented mixing of private enterprise and government policy. It directly solicited access to Trump with secret payments and currency swaps from foreign investors, companies, and individuals with criminal records and investigations. At least one investigation was dropped after payment worth several million was made to the firm, and Trump granted an official pardon to an investor of a company World Liberty had invested in. Trump's family received a cut of all transactions made through the World Liberty, and the company directly advertised its connections to Trump, who disclosed income of nearly US$60 million in an ethics filing. Several actions taken by Trump's administration regarding cryptocurrency were noted to bolster the company's assets and position. A spokeswoman for Trump stated that since his assets were in a trust managed by his children, there were "no conflicts of interest". On May 12, 2025, another family bitcoin company co-founded by Eric Trump in March, American Bitcoin, announced plans to go public by merging with an existing Nasdaq company.

In June 2026, a Reuters analysis estimated Trump and his family had made $2.3 billion from his crypto ventures, with investors losing the same amount. As of his July 2026 financial report, Trump made over $2.2B in 2025 compared to $622M in 2024, of which $1.4B came from his family's cryptocurrency business. It stated that gains in the stock market could not account for the majority of the income raised. The New York Times described Trump's windfall as "unimaginable for any leader of a liberal democracy" with few global precedents, and that it had "moved him into an echelon of enrichment more associated with strongmen in Russia and Turkey". In August 2026, The New York Times reported that most of Trump's $1.4B from his cryptocurrency businesses came from anonymous sources. $100M came from Guren "Bobby" Zhou, who had previously been charged with money laundering in Britain. Of that $100M, $75M went to a company controlled by Trump and his three sons, some of which also benefitted his administration's peace envoy Steve Witkoff. It described the case of Zhou as showing "the ease with which buyers with unknown backgrounds and motivations can use the anonymity of cryptocurrency to shower Mr. Trump with money".

=== World Liberty Financial ===
World Liberty Financial logo

MGX Fund Management Limited chaired by Sheikh Tahnoon put $2 billion into World Liberty Financial to invest in binance. Two weeks later, Trump announced "over $200 billion in commercial deals between the United States and the United Arab Emirates—bringing the total of investment agreements in the Gulf region to over $2 trillion" Discussions reportedly involved David O. Sacks and Steve Witkoff. Trump pardoned Binance founder Changpeng Zhao.

After the 2024 US presidential election, Eric Trump signed a deal for a 49% stake in World Liberty Financial (WLF) with Aryam Investment (which is under Sheikh Tahnoon) making Aryam the largest shareholder in WLF. The deal was described in The Wall Street Journal as "unprecedented in American politics: a foreign government official taking a major ownership stake in an incoming U.S. president's company". "Disclosures on World Liberty's website showed the Trump family's equity interest fell to 38% from 75% last year, indicating someone had likely purchased a stake, but the company has never disclosed a buyer." "The deal placed two Aryam executives, who also held top positions at Tahnoon's G42, on World Liberty's five-person board, which at the time included Eric Trump and Zach Witkoff". The two executives also "would play key roles in the U.A.E.'s chip lobbying efforts with the Trump administration". The deal did not include "the rights to future WLFI token sales, leaving the Tahnoon-backed entity out of what was then the company's only source of revenue". "The deal to purchase the stake was hugely profitable to World Liberty's founders. (...) Of the first $250 million installment from the Tahnoon-backed company (...) $187 million was directed to Trump family entities DT Marks DEFI LLC and DT Marks SC LLC (...) Trump personally owned 70% of DT Marks DEFI while other family members owned 30% as of the end of 2024". In March 2025, Trump hosted a White House dinner for Tahnoon which included the vice president and multiple members of the cabinet. Former government officials said typically foreign officials meet with their US counterparts rather than the president. The UAE had also pushed for faster review of investments in the US which in May 2025 the US Treasury announced it would launch. In May 2025, at the royal palace in Abu Dhabi, Trump told Mohamed bin Zayed Al Nahyan "Your relationship and mine can't get better, so I can't say it's going to get better because it's at the highest level it can be." Tahnoon's MGX Fund Management Limited also became an investor in the TikTok USDS Joint Venture following efforts to ban TikTok in the United States.

== Investigations and reactions ==
=== Investigations ===
In late 2026, Politico reported that congressional Democrats were "preparing an all-out oversight campaign targeting President Donald Trump, his family and administration" should they win the House in the 2026 elections. It described Representatives Robert Garcia of the Oversight Committee and Jamie Raskin of the Judiciary Committee as leading efforts to investigate Trump. The use of "subpoena power and public hearings" were expected to bolster Democratic messaging about accountability in the lead up to the 2028 presidential election.

=== Polling ===
An August 2026 Reuters/Ipsos poll found 63% of Americans believe that "Trump and his family have inappropriately profited from cryptocurrency" and nearly seven in ten Americans believe Trump's private business dealings have influenced his presidential decisions, including 48% of Republicans. An August 2026 Economist/YouGov poll also found 65% of Americans disapproved of Trump and his family's private business dealings with foreign countries, with 37% of Republicans disapproving. It also found 61% disapproved of Trump's foreign gifts and 64% disapproved of Trump's personal investment in crytocurrency.

== See also ==
- Bibliography of Donald Trump
- List of federal political scandals in the United States (21st century)
