= Insider trading allegations during the second Trump administration =

A number of financial analysts have identified significant signs of insider trading in the U.S. government during the second presidency of Donald Trump. Allegations of insider trading have focused on U.S. officials, anonymous accounts on prediction markets with suspiciously high win rates, as well as Trump and his family.

While previous presidents have employed blind trusts or otherwise refrained from trading while in office, Trump has made billions of dollars from security trades since 2025. He has bought stocks of multiple companies that have been impacted by his decisions as president, and publicly promoted companies whose stocks he had bought. Trump said in June 2026 that his children have had "inside information" while trading stocks impacted by his presidential actions, and denied any illegal conduct. United States conflict-of-interest laws do not prohibit the president of the United States from "participating personally and substantially in a particular Government matter that will affect his own financial interests".

Prediction market platforms soared in popularity after Trump was elected for the second time, with many well-timed trades done mostly by newly-created and single-purpose accounts correctly predicting actions by the executive branch of the United States shortly before they happened. Accounts suspected of insider trading have on multiple occasions bet on events such as the 2026 Iran War and tariffs decisions of Trump.

== Suspicions over political bets ==
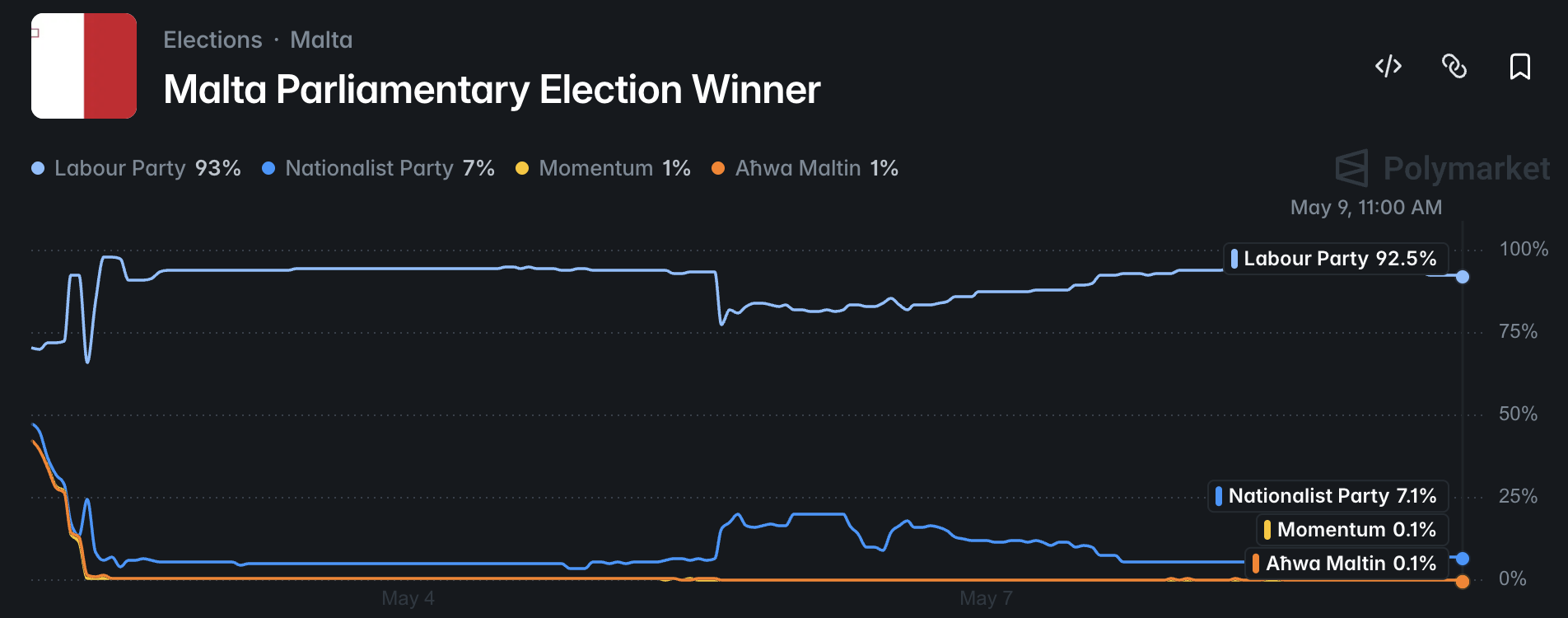
A chart of election-related predictions on Polymarket, 2026

A number of well-timed trades have been recorded soon before major geopolitical decisions were made by the executive branch of the United States during the second Trump administration. Most of such transfers have taken place on prediction market platform Polymarket, company that allows anonymous users to bet on future events taking place. Those bets were often carried out by newly-created accounts, as well as accounts that focus only on one event. Polymarket lists Donald Trump Jr. as an investor and board advisor.

According to a March 2026 article NBC News, "[d]ata suggests traders with advanced knowledge of geopolitical events may have collectively pocketed millions from recent bets" on Polymarket. The platform dramatically rose in popularity after the 2024 United States presidential election, when most users correctly predicted that Trump would win. Because some of Polymarket's departments operate from outside the United States, the company is not required to follow know your customer laws.

Trump Media announced in July 2026 that it would start offering a paid service to provide "fast[er]" access to influential Truth Social posts, including posts made by Trump, which have often impacted securities. The company stated that "Markets already move on Truth Social posts... As adoption grows, we expect [the service] to become a meaningful, ongoing source of revenue for the company". American attorney Robert Frenchman said that "tech platform[s] can tier its distribution of information" that can affect securities, even though it "certainly does not seem fair". Colorado representative Jason Crow said that this move would enable Trump to profit from insider trading. New York University economics professor Gian Luca Clementi said that "This is insider trading by definition."

=== Liberation Day tariffs pause ===
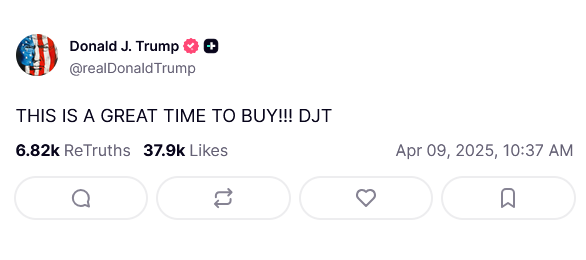
Trump's post on Truth Social

On 2 April 2025, president Trump announced wide-ranging tariffs impacting most countries in the world and causing a steep drop in the stock market. Trump announced a 90 day pause on the majority of these tariffs on 9 April, four hours after posting on Truth Social that "THIS IS A GREAT TIME TO BUY!!!". In the minutes leading up to the announcement, an unusually high number of trades took place on an S&P 500 tracker fund with over 10,000 contracts traded per minute when only hundreds were being traded earlier in the day. Following Trump's announcement, the stock market made one of the largest single day gains post-World War II, with the S&P 500 rising by 9.5% with a profit of almost 20 million dollars generated for these traders. At the time Adam Schiff stated that the President's social media posts were potential proof of insider trading or stock manipulation and demanded a review of any communications between the White House and executive branch agency employees, while Hakeem Jeffries announced that House Democrats would be launching investigations into market manipulation. The administration's trade representative Jamieson Greer denied that it was market manipulation while testifying in a House committee meeting.

Trump's 2026 financial disclosure revealed that Trump himself bought 327 stocks valuated at around $12.8 million on 8 April 2025, the day before the tariff pause. This included companies like Apple, Alphabet, Amazon, Microsoft and Nvidia which rose sharply after the anouncement.

=== Venezuela intervention ===
Between 30 December 2025 and 2 January 2026, a newly created Polymarket account named Burdensome-Mix was found to have placed $32,537 on President Maduro being out of office by the end of January 2026, resulting in the account winning $436,000 as a result of the 3 January capture of Nicolas Maduro, the account then changed its name and became inactive. A small number of other accounts also got substantial winnings over Maduro's capture.

The person who made the bet was later identified, according to investigators, as a master sergeant of the United States Army involved in planning the operation. He was charged in April with "unlawful use of confidential government information for personal gain, theft of nonpublic government information, commodities fraud, wire fraud and making an unlawful monetary transaction". In a separate lawsuit brought by the Commodity Futures Trading Commission he was also charged with insider trading. This event prompted House representative Ritchie Torres to introduce a bill banning government employees from using prediction markets if they have access to insider information.

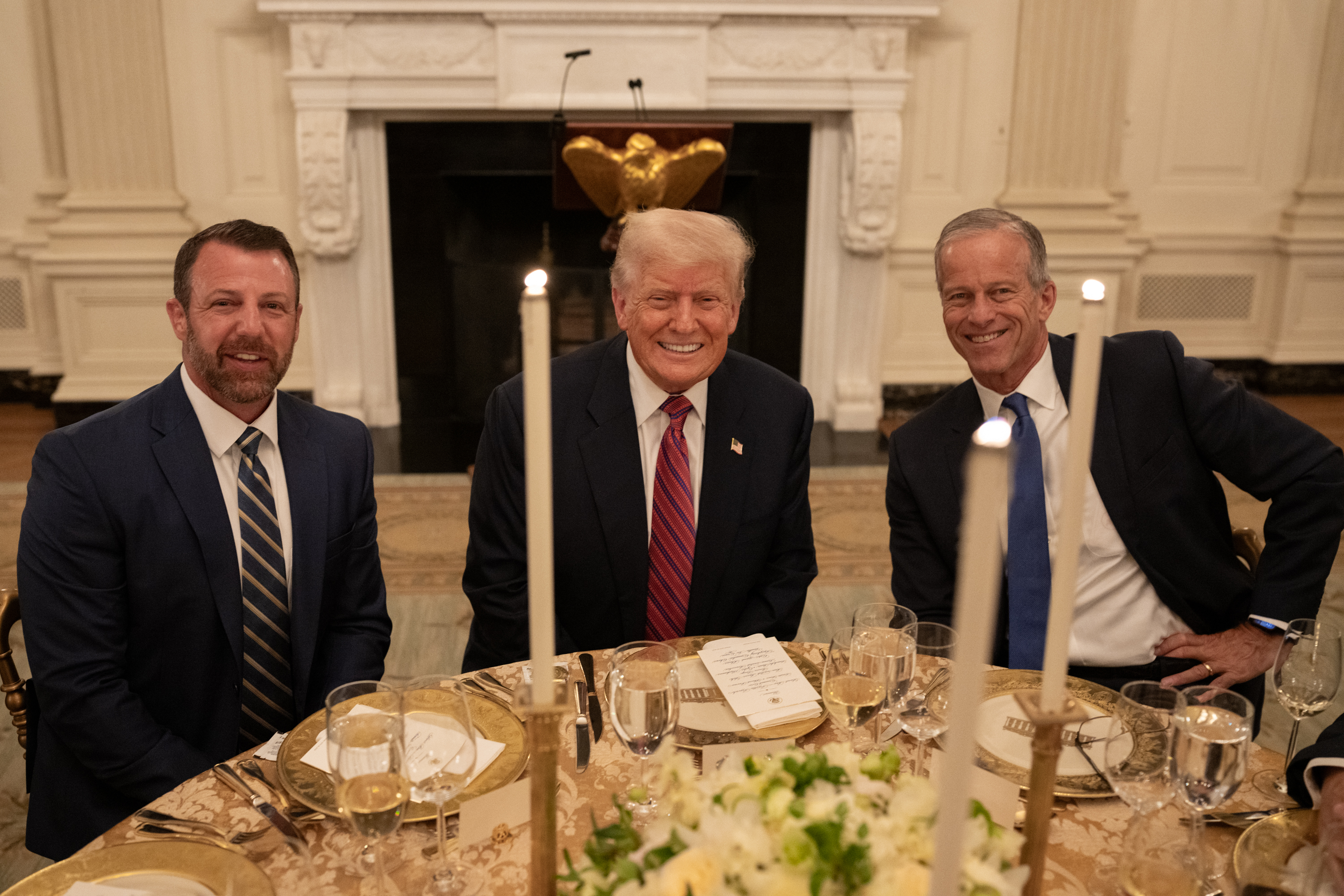
Mullin, to the left of Trump, in July 2025

On 29 December 2025, Oklahoma Senator Markwayne Mullin, who was then on the United States Senate Committee on Armed Services and who would go on to replace Kristi Noem as United States Secretary of Homeland Security the following March, bought between $15,000 and $50,000 worth of shares in both Chevron, the only major US oil company operating in Venezuela, and defence company Raytheon, among 29 other stocks. When asked by The Oklahoman, a Mullin spokesperson denied that Mullin any input on the trades made by the company that manages his stock trading.

=== During the 2026 Iran war ===
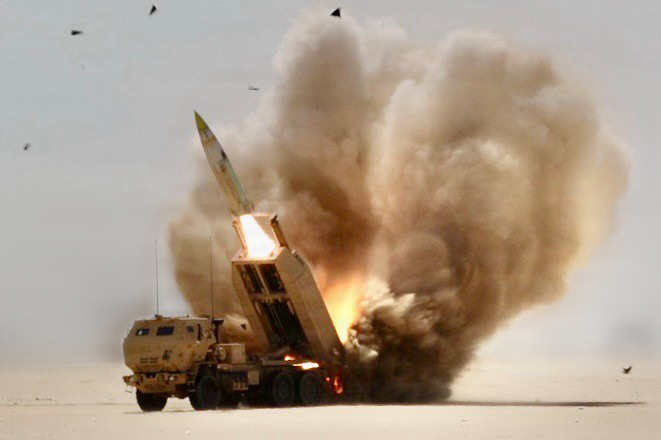
Multiple prediction market accounts have bet on specific U.S. military actions during the 2026 Iran war with accuracy rates as high as 98%.

Following the beginning of hostilities related to the 2026 Iran war, the oil market was impacted as a result of the fuel crisis caused by strikes to oil infrastructure in the region and the closure of the Strait of Hormuz. On at least two occasions throughout the conflict, President Trump made announcements that would impact oil prices that would be preceded by unusual activity in the market. News articles refer to oil price declines in response to Trump's announcements of "positive" war progress as purposeful acts of "jawboning" to suppress oil prices.

- On 9 March 2026 Trump said in a phone interview that the war was "very complete, pretty much", 47 minutes before the public could have known about this interview there was a surge of activity predicting that the oil price would drop. Immediately after the interview was made public the oil price dropped by 14%.
- On 23 March 2026 a post by the President on Truth Social announcing good progress in conversations with Iran over a resolution to hostilities as well as announcing a pause to strikes on Iranian power plants prompted another 10% drop in oil prices. 14 minutes before the post went live there was an unusually high level of trades of oil futures with about 6 million barrels of oil, valued at $580 million sold between 6:49 am and 6:51 am. Other stocks also saw similar trading activity with S&P 500 E-minis also surging at 6:50 am. Later in the day Iran announced that no such talks had taken place, causing the oil price to creep back up. Paul Krugman stated that the obvious explanation was that someone close to Trump that knew what he was about to do was exploiting that insider information to make instant profits and accused the people doing it of treason for profiting from national security information. Trump's financial disclosures released in May 2026 revealed that Trump's brokerage account spent the day buying stocks in oil and defense companies that stood to profit from the war.

An analysis by the New York Times found that, one day before the 2026 Iran war began, about 150 Polymarkets accounts correctly predicted that the United States would strike Iran precisely on the day after. According to The Times, such predictions were "relatively uncommon" before those accounts started betting. Dartmouth economics professor and prediction markets expert Eric Zitzewitz said that such moves "makes you think it was someone who knew something about the timing". A report by blockchain analysis company Bubblemaps found that most of the accounts that had correctly predicted the timing of the United States' first strikes on Iran were relatively new at the time and had never bet on any other event. Groups of as many as 38 accounts that had bet on the day of the start of the war are believed to have belonged to one individual, with analysts like Ben Yorke saying that the use of fresh wallets with no history and splitting the bets between multiple wallets to hid to avoid detection raise red flags for suspicious betting and potential insider trading.

A May 2026 investigation conducted by Bubblemaps reported nine Polymarket accounts that had predicted 80 specific events during the Iran war with an accuracy rate of 98%. Bubblemaps CEO Nicolas Vaiman stated that "[t]his might be the most insane pattern we have found on Polymarket so far" and that "Luck alone cannot explain those numbers."

A Polymarket account that had an accuracy rate of 83% profited $967,000 on a series of bets on US and Israeli military action against Iran, dating back to the October 2024 Israeli strikes on Iran and the 2025 United States strikes on Iranian nuclear sites and including the 2026 conflict. The account focused mainly on Iran, and had an accuracy rate of 93% for their bets over $10,000. Georgia State University Finance professor Todd Phillips said that "[i]t sure seems like this person either has incredible luck, or was insider trading". Bubblemaps stated that "[a]ll of this is strong signaling of insider activity, based on the amount they made, the markets they bet on, the timing of their trades, the success rates of these trades, and the fact that they are connected on-chain".

=== Other bets ===
Gabriel Perez, Trump's longtime White House teleprompter, was fired in July 2026 after he was flagged by a prediction market platform for insider trading. He was placed under investigation by the Commodity Futures Trading Commission (CFTC) and his investments, which sources say have made $90,000 in profits, were frozen. In August 2026, the CFTC fined Perez $172,000 for exploiting non-public information on the Kalshi prediction market "for his personal benefit".

== Investments of the Trump family and acquaintances ==
Trump stated in a July 2026 interview with CNBC's Joe Kernen that his children have had "inside information" while trading assets, arguing that the scope of his presidency's impact on the economy is so large that even "[i]f they buy an energy efficient truck, they have inside information". He told Kernen that he had told his children to "stay away", "[b]ut they also have a life. You know, they were doing business long before I ever thought of running for president".

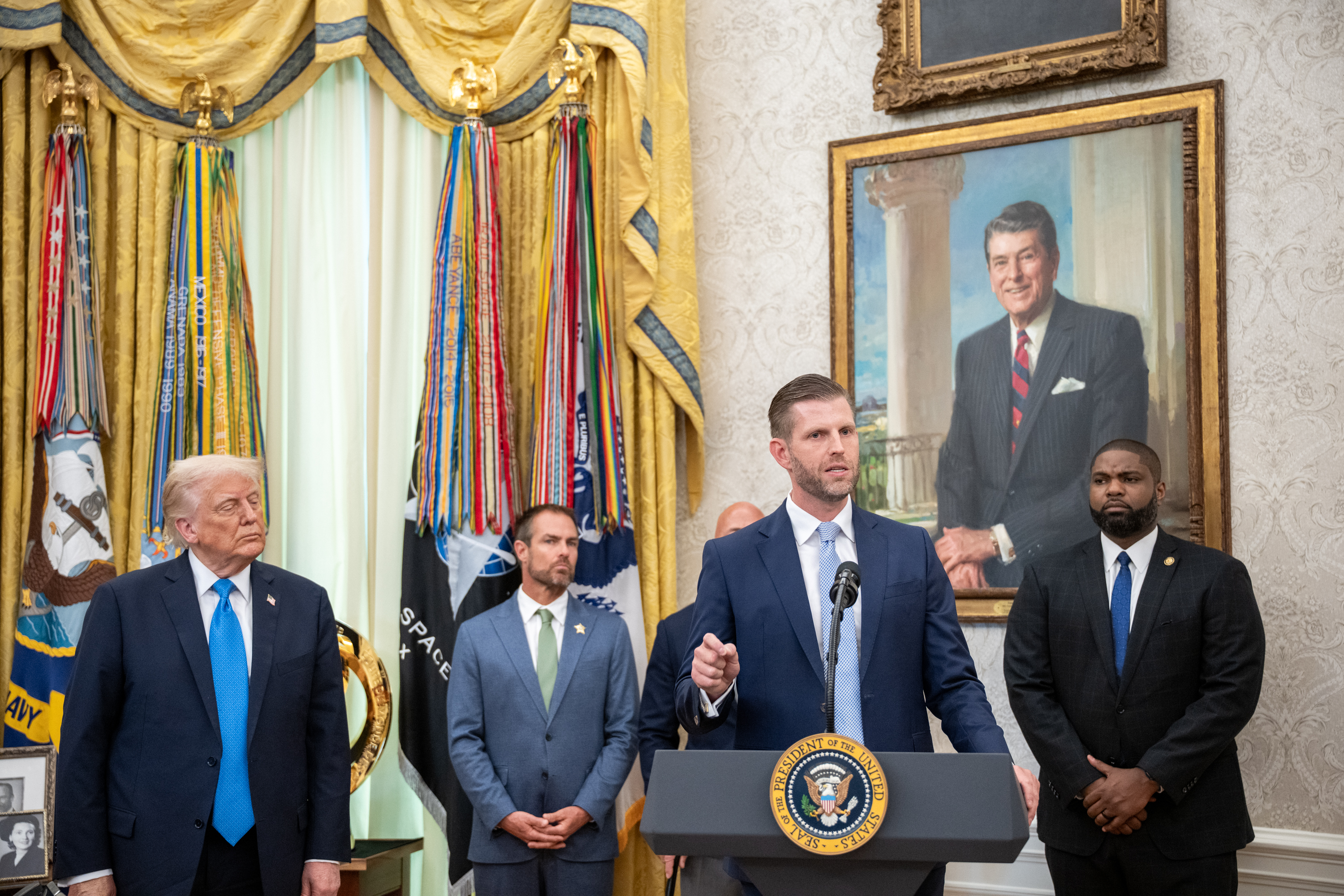
Eric speaking at a White House event in 2025

While arguing for the legality of his $580 million income from crypto investments in 2025, Trump told Kernen that federal conflict of interest laws do not require the president of the United States to recuse himself from making a decision that might benefit his wealth. He said that he "didn't" know about his crypto investments while making decisions as president, but "could" have. Trump stated that his son Eric handles his finances, and that "I don't talk to him about things such as this. I think I'd be allowed to. I'm not sure even what the status is, but I don't."

In that interview, Trump said that "Because every time my kids do, if they invest in a stock, or they go and do a building, anything they do, because the presidency is so powerful, so big, everything, if they buy a cupcake company, well, the energy to make the cupcakes is, you know, sort of like, how's my energy policy? So, therefore, you have a conflict".

United States federal law does not prohibit the president or vice-president of the United States from "participating personally and substantially in a particular [g]overnment matter that will affect his own financial interests, [or] the financial interests of certain individuals with whom he has ties outside the [g]overnment".

As president, Trump is required to disclose security transfers of at least $1,000 within 45 days. As of July 2, 2026, he had never made any such disclosures for 2025. While previous presidents have avoided trading while in office, Trump continued to do so throughout his second administration (he had previously said that he had sold all of his stocks before becoming president in 2017). A The New Yorker analysis reported that he and his family had a $4 billion income from trading in 2025. Trump's financial disclosures, released in May 2026 revealed 3642 individual trades from Trump's brokerage account between January and March 2026, equating to 60 trades per day and between $220 million and $750 million in volume.

=== Oil Industry ===
An investigation by The Guardian found that two fossil fuel billionaires, following the IPO of their company Venture Global LNG, on 24 January 2024, made no significant attempt to acquire additional shares, except for between 10 and 14 March when they had acquired 1.2 million shares (worth $12 million) each. On 6 March U.S. Energy Secretary Chris Wright and United States Secretary of the Interior Doug Burgum had attended an event where the company announced an expansion of one of its export terminals. On 19 March Wright granted the company an export license to the Cameron Parish 2 (CP2) terminal, causing the value of the company's share price to rise over the next two days. After this was revealed Jeff Merkley said that "the timing of the stock trades certainly merits investigation for potential conflicts of interest and insider trading.

=== Tech Industry ===
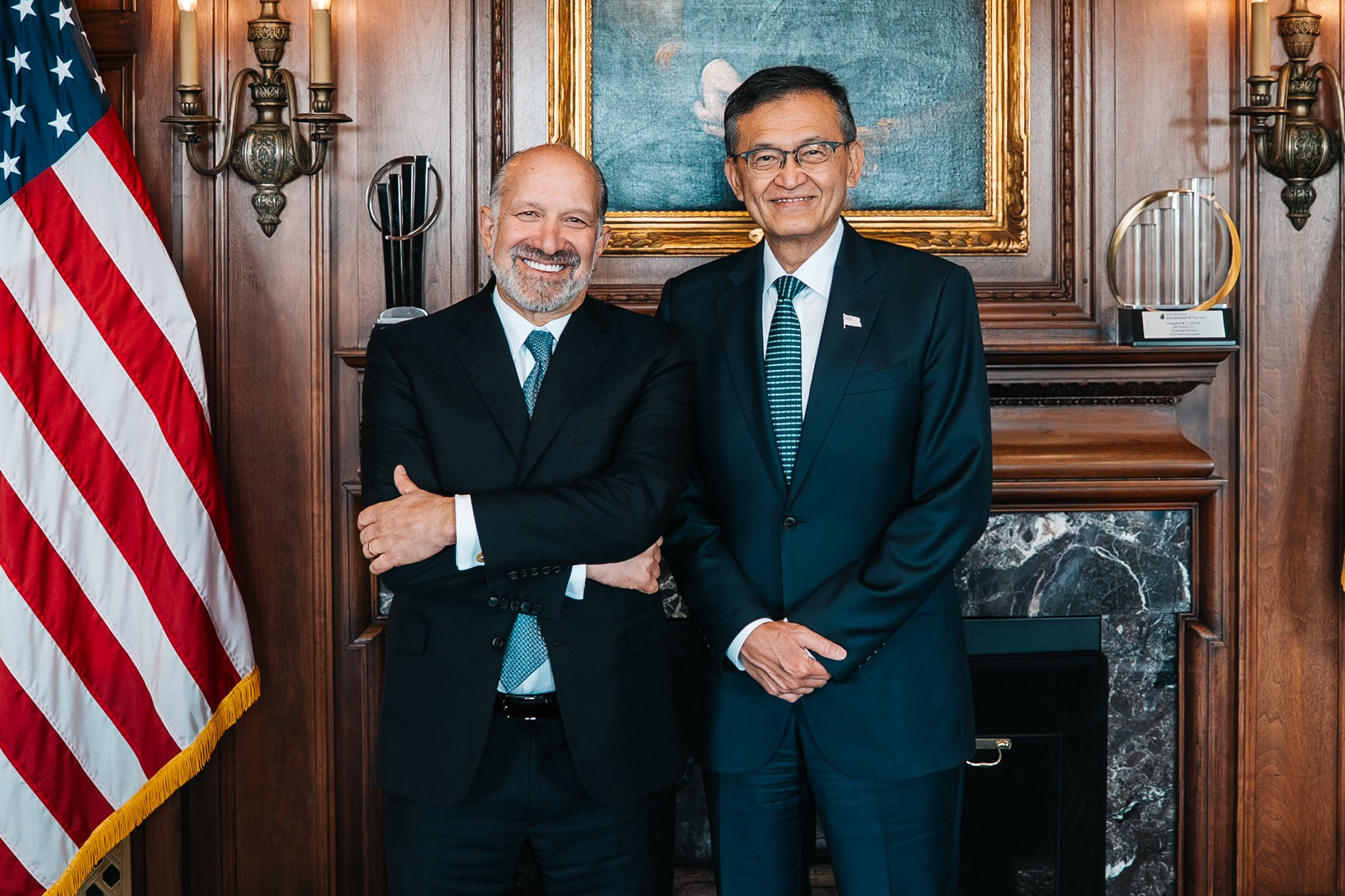
United States Commerce Secretary Howard Lutnick and Intel CEO Lip-Bu Tan on August 22, 2025

Trump bought hundreds of thousands of dollars in Intel stocks on August 18, 2025. Four days later, the United States government bought $9 billion equity in the company, causing its stocks to climb.

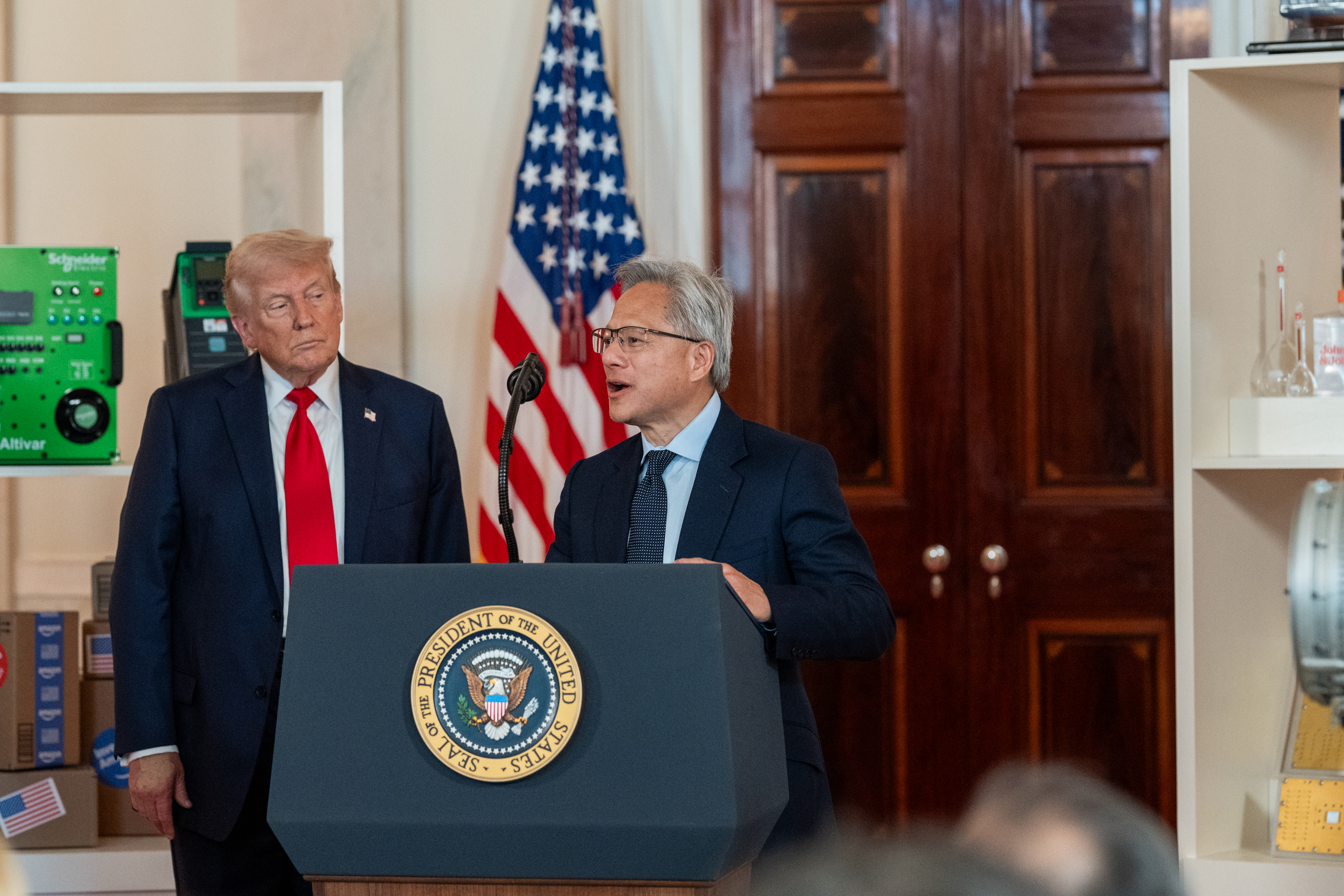
Trump and Nvidia CEO Jensen Huang during an Investing in America event in April 2026

Trump's financial disclosures showed that his investments skewed towards the tech sector, with the timing of some transactions coinciding with news from the companies. According to MSNBC's Michael A. Cohen, Trump invested $5 million in Nvidia stocks in early 2026 "right before [it] received permission to export its advanced H200 AI processors to China". The company's stocks soon climbed, earning Trump a profit. As of May, the company's stock was at 178% from the beginning of the year. On another occasion, on February 10 Trump purchased between $1 million and $5 million of Nvidia stock and a week later the company announced a major chip deal with Meta.

Trump's ownership of Nvidia stock also drew criticism from Elizabeth Warren after Trump brought Jensen Huang on a trip to China in an apparent effort to help the company sell chips.

=== Defense Industry ===
Eric Trump and Donald Trump Jr. have also invested money in a number firms involved in the defense and drone industries. Donald Jr has $4 million investment in the drone parts start-up Unusual Machines which received a $620 million loan from the Department of Defense in December 2025 and he is also a partner in 1789 Capital, a venture capital fund invested in a number of defense start-ups, which has increased in value more than 1000% since Trump's re-election, while Eric is invested in the company Xtend which has a contract with the DoD and supplies attack drones to the Israel Defense Forces and whose drones have been deployed to Iran.

In February 2026, Trump bought Axon stocks valued 1 to $5 million. In the next week, ICE announced its intention to buy $220 million worth of security equipments, making Axon's stocks climb by 34%. A representative for Citizens for Responsibility and Ethics in Washington expressed concerns that Trump had "bought into a company whose business could grow if his own administration expands immigration enforcement". The Trump administration denied any conflict of interest on the matter.

Trump's financial disclosure from May 2026 revealed a consistent pattern of Trump's brokerage hedging the conflict by buying gold, treasury bonds and cash, as well as owning stocks of companies that had been impacted by the Iran war, such as Lockheed Martin, General Dynamics and Northrop Grumman. George W. Bush administration ethics advisor Richard Painter said about those investments that "[i]f he were defense secretary, he would be committing a crime" and that such information displayed "a fundamental breach of trust". Trump has increased Palantir's contracts while owning their stocks, including a $1 billion agreement with the Department of Homeland Security.

== Policing of insider trading ==
=== By the U.S. government ===
A NOTUS report found that the Public Integrity Section of the Department of Justice, an anti-corruption agency, lost 34 of the 36 lawyers it had from 2025 to 2026. The agency also had its permission to file new lawsuits revoked. Three anonymous officials told Reuters in 2026 that a SEC official resigned after being blocked from prosecuting companies connected to Trump.

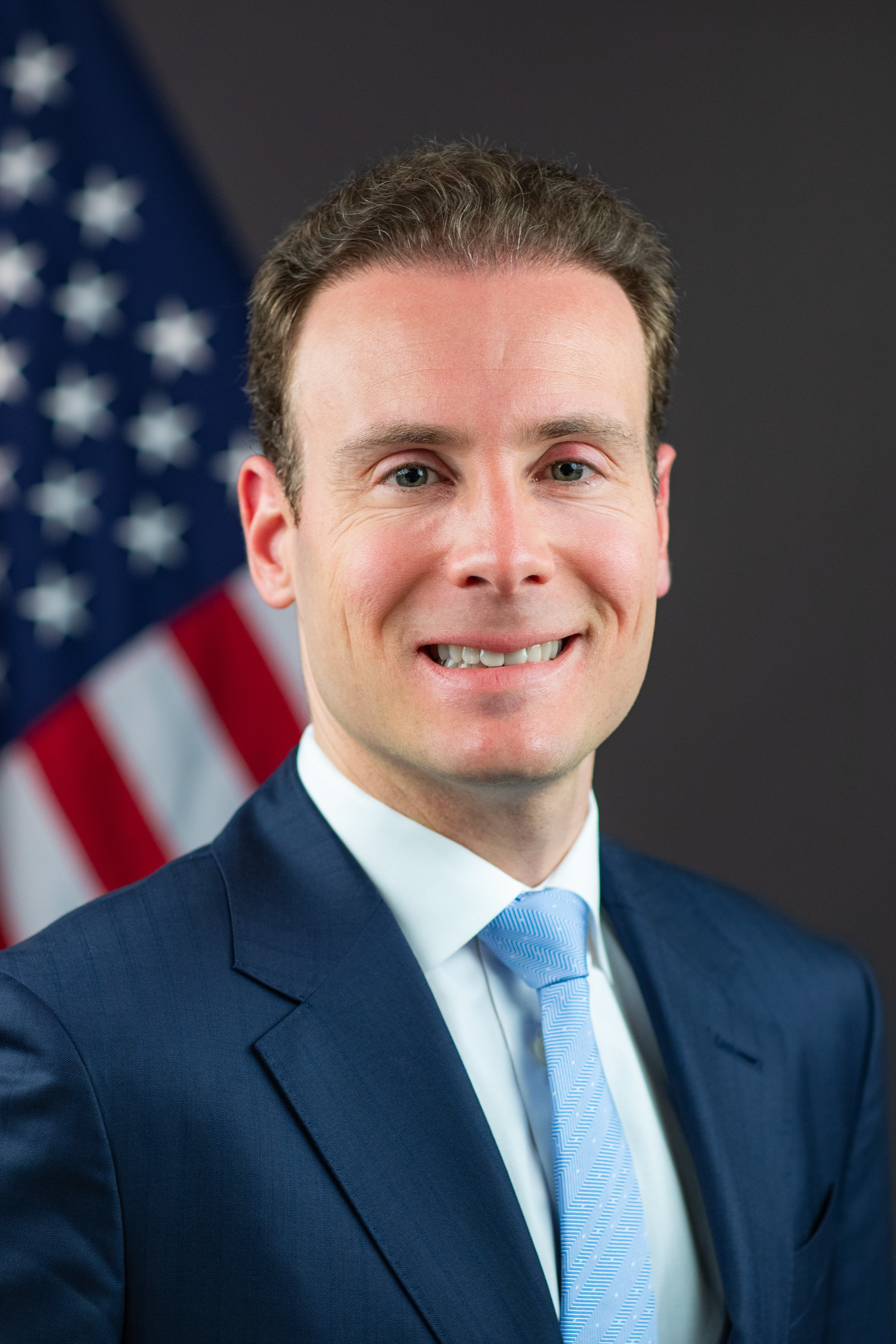
CFTC chair Michael Selig

After the CFTC and Justice Department ended a number of Biden-era investigations on suspected unlawful activities taking place on Polymarket, the company announced that Donald Trump Jr. would be joining its board of advisors. Polymarket also announced that another company that had him as a partner would be investing in it.

=== By prediction market platforms ===
After a number of the platform's users were accused of insider trading, Polymarket announced new rules in March 2026 to ban insider trading. Kalshi, a prediction market company that has Eric and Donald Trump Jr. as advisors, also did the same.

Kalshi began requiring in June 2026 that some of its users reveal information about their employers. It also began providing a special service to whistleblowers. The company stated that it had blocked about a hundred suspected insider trading operations in the first quarter of the year.

== See also ==
- Corruption allegations during the second Trump presidency
