= Moral suasion =

Persuasion technique

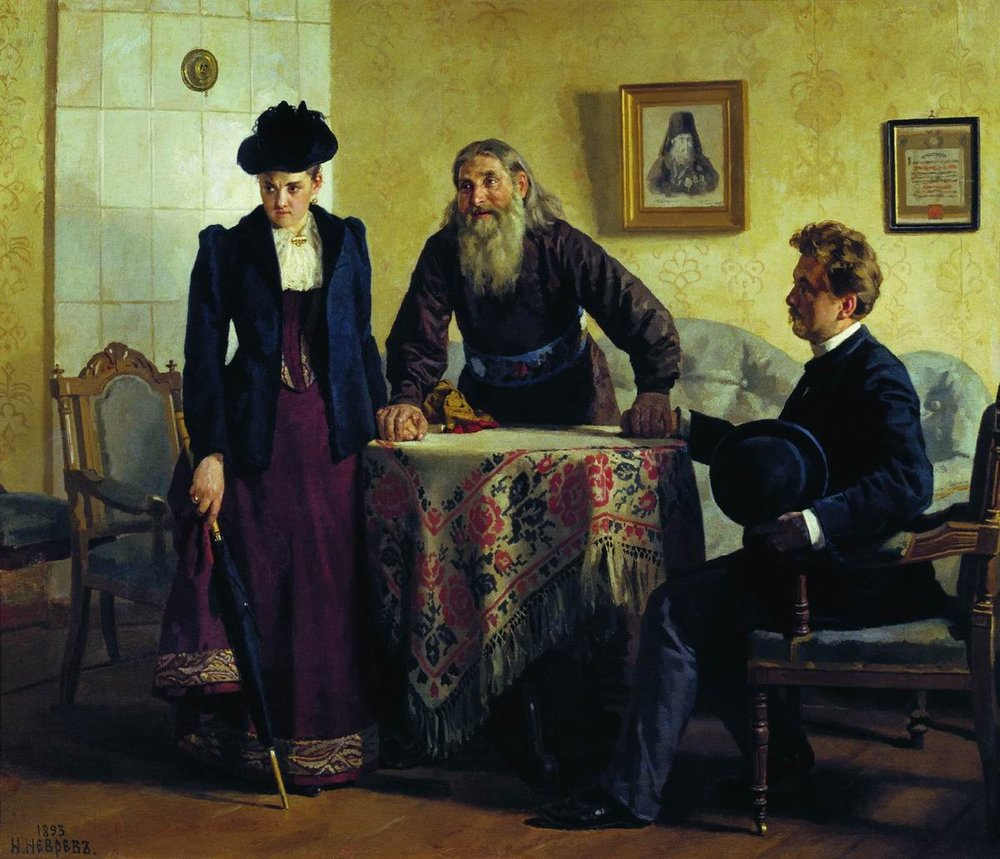
Moral Suasion, by Nikolai Nevrev, Moscow (1893)

Moral suasion is an appeal to morality, in order to influence or change behavior. A famous example is the attempt by William Lloyd Garrison and his American Anti-Slavery Society to end slavery in the United States by arguing that the practice was morally wrong.

In economics and economic psychology, moral suasion is more specifically defined as "the attempt to coerce private or detrimental economic activity via governmental exhortation in directions not already defined or dictated by existing statute law". The "moral" aspect comes from the pressure for "moral responsibility" to operate in a way that is consistent with furthering the good of the economy. Moral suasion in this narrower sense is also sometimes known as jawboning. In rhetoric, moral suasion is closely aligned with Aristotle's concept of pathos, which is one of the three modes of persuasion and describes an appeal to the moral principles of the audience.

There are two types of moral suasion:

- "Pure" moral suasion is an appeal for altruistic behaviour, and is rarely used in economic policy.
- "Impure" moral suasion, which is the usual meaning of "moral suasion" in economics, is backed by explicit or implicit threats by authorities to provide incentives to comply with the authorities' wishes.

== Pure moral suasion ==
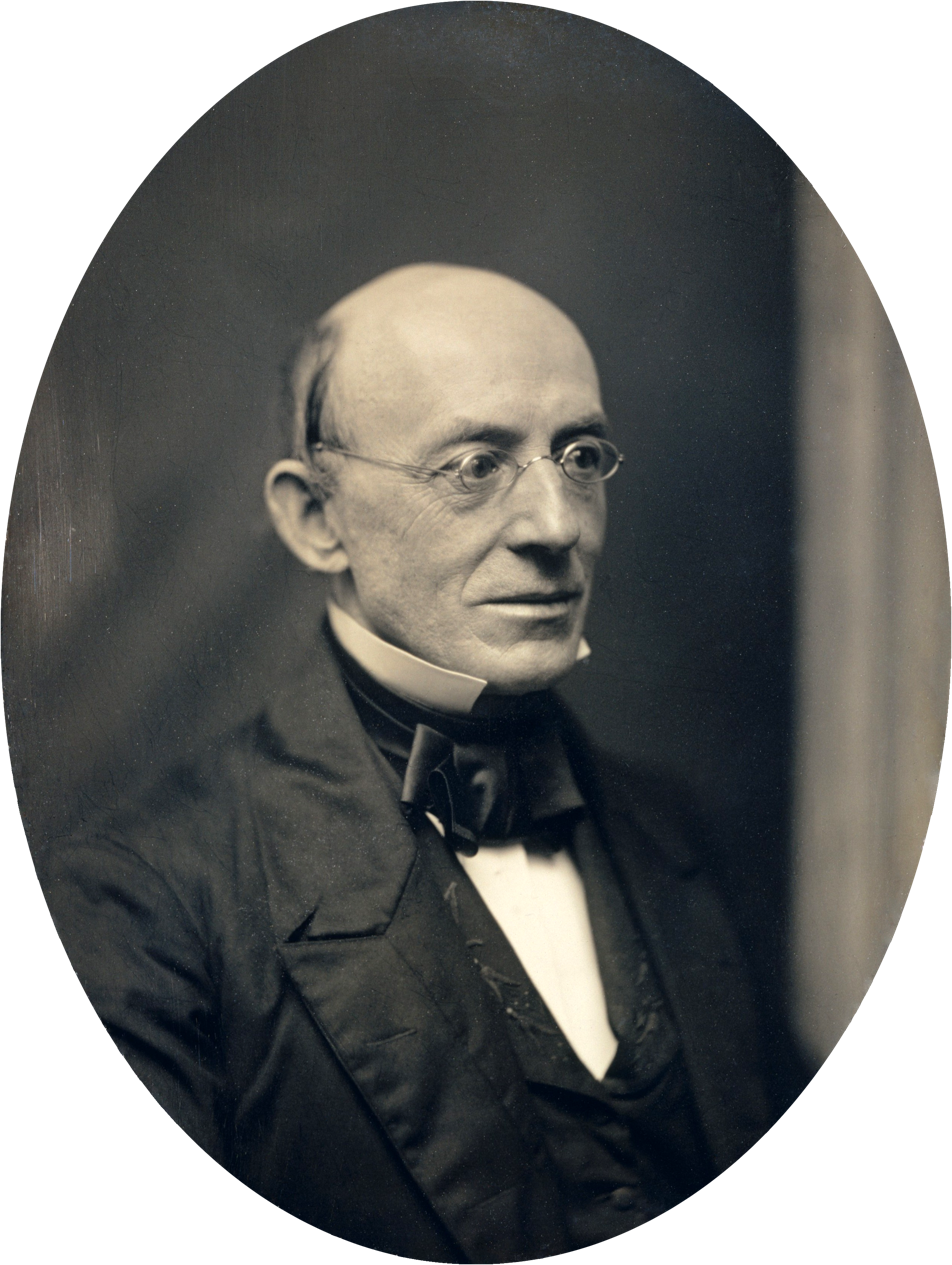
William Lloyd Garrison attempted to end slavery by moral suasion.

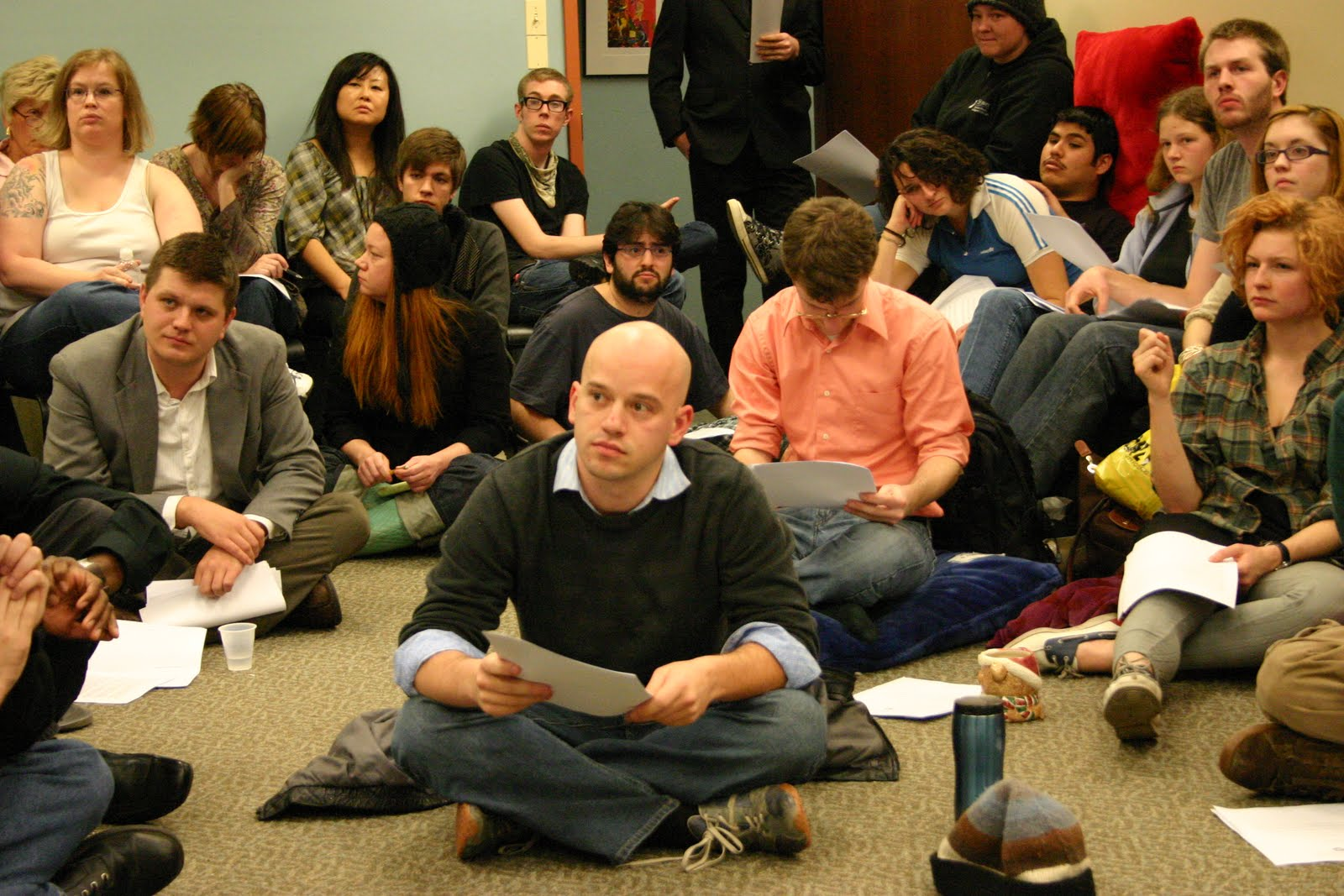
The Assembly of Shimer College, which "governs by virtue of the moral suasion established by communal deliberation"

Moral suasion has been applied in many different fields. In early educational thought, it was often paired against corporal punishment as a means of achieving school discipline. Similarly, in parenting, writers from the 19th century through Benjamin Spock have advocated the use of moral suasion with children as an alternative to physical violence. In politics, moral suasion has frequently been employed by charities and movements for social change, but its effectiveness has varied widely.

=== Examples ===
==== Temperance movement ====
In the temperance movement of the 18th and the early 19th centuries in Britain and North America, moral suasion was initially a key part of the strategy for reducing the prevalence of alcohol in society. As the movement began to face the limitations of the strategy in the late 19th century, its members turned to legal coercion, which led to the rise of prohibitionism.

==== US civil rights movement ====
In the civil rights movement in the 20th century, moral suasion was one of three major prongs of the movement, the others being legal action and collective nonviolent protest. After initial victories, the nonviolent strategy began to struggle in the 1960s and largely ended by the assassination of Martin Luther King Jr.

==== Promoting religious tolerance ====
Moral suasion has sometimes been effective in resolving religious disharmony, especially if the government is actively involved as a mediator. Moral suasion has been effective in Singapore in the creation of religious harmony among different religious groups. When conflicts arise, the government's approach is to mediate or resolve the issue through common sense, and moral suasion using the collective efforts of the community, grassroots and religious leaders.

==== Environment protection ====
The use of moral suasion in environment regulation is making polluters feel responsible for the negative externalities that they cause. Moral suasion can be very efficient from an economic standpoint since economic agents are free to use any cost-minimising solution deal with their negative externalities, instead of having to rely on a government-prescribed regulation or tax. Furthermore, the administrative costs of using moral suasion to deal with environmental problems are very low.

A study of marine debris regulations in the United States from 1989 to 1993 revealed that moral suasion can be an effective tool to limit the discharge of trash into water, despite the offenders' low probability of being detected. The evidence on the effectiveness of moral suasion methods to induce environmentally desirable behaviour, however, is not strong unless it is coupled with other instruments. For example, Canadian policymakers advocates for moral suasion in their endeavour to achieve environmental and wildlife policy objectives, a course of action that is likely to fail if little regard is placed on the accompanying incentives.

== Impure moral suasion ==
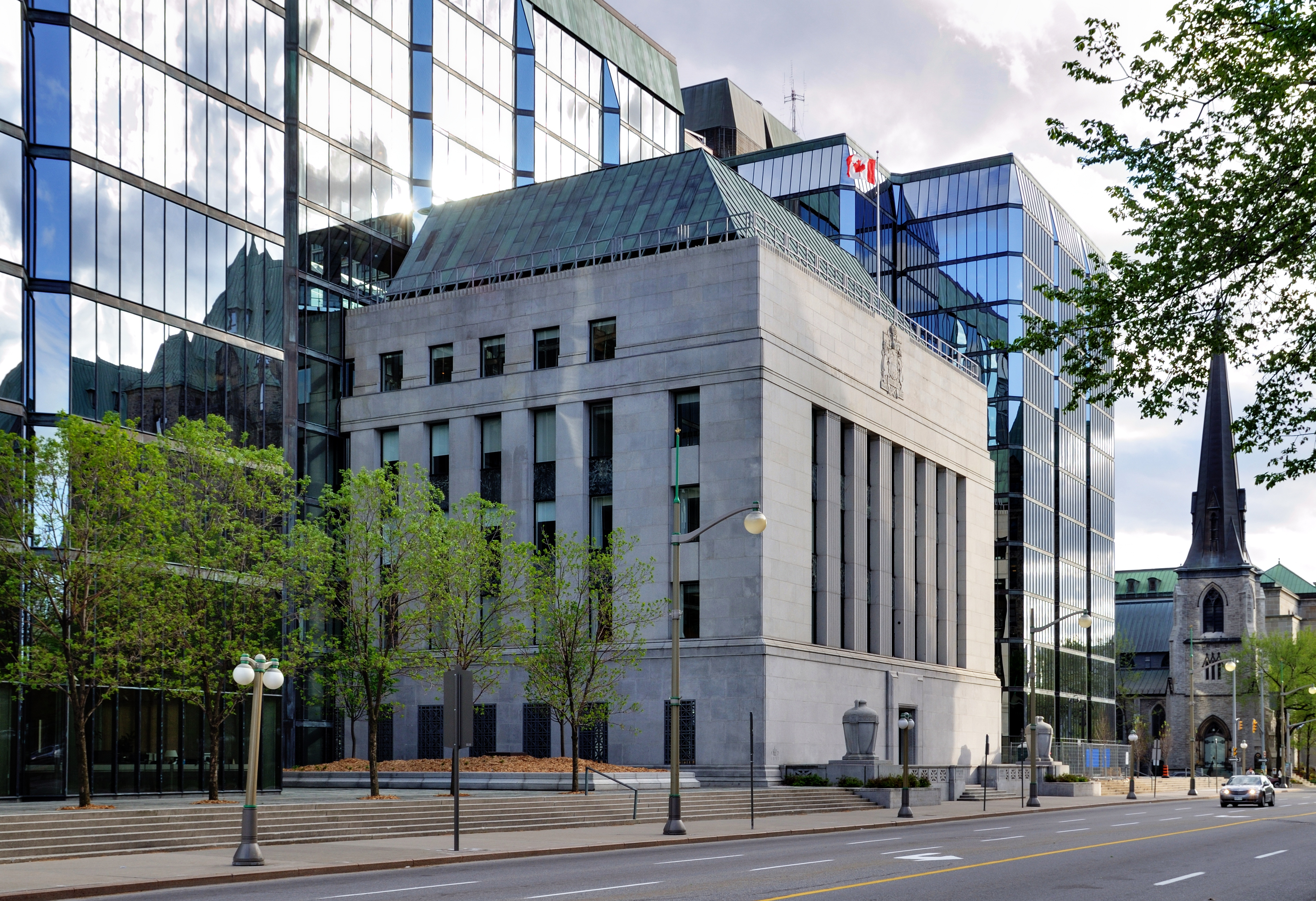
Headquarters of the Bank of Canada, a central bank. Central banks often use impure moral suasion to control the credit supply.

As a policy tool, impure moral suasion differs from direct suasion using laws and regulations in that penalties for noncompliance are not systematically assessed on noncompliers. That has led some authors to criticise moral suasion as immoral since compliers get penalised for co-operating with the stated government agenda and thus incur extra costs, but noncompliers are not punished. Other objections to the use of moral suasion include that it constitutes extra-legal coercion by the government, adds uncertainty to the regulatory process, and can undermine or delay the implementation of effective legislation.

=== Effectiveness ===
Moral suasion is "an effective economic policy whenever the expected costs of noncompliance is made to exceed the cost of compliance".

That requires two necessary conditions:

- First, citizens must support the government's policy, thus entailing objective congruence between the promoter of moral suasion and the target whose behaviour should be changed. The support emanates from such factors that determine compliance as potential illegal gain, severity and certainty of sanctions, individuals' moral development and their standards of personal morality, individuals' perceptions of how just and moral are rules being enforced, and social environmental influences. For example, during the hyperinflation in Zimbabwe, most of the business community accepted foreign currency as a medium of exchange in violation of the country's exchange control rules and regulations despite calls by the Central Bank to persuade stakeholders to accept only the local currency as medium of exchange. The business community felt that the rules that were enforced through moral suasion not to be just and moral. Thus, factors that determine compliance are the government's objectives, the cost of noncompliance, and whether social reputation suffers if noncomplance is known about.
- Second, the population of economic agent to be persuaded must be small. A small number entails the easy identification of economic agents to persuade and increases the perceived likelihood that noncompliers will be identified and punished.

Even if those two necessary conditions are not fully met, moral suasion, if it is only partially effective, can be a valid choice of policy instruments if the alternatives are doing nothing or taking actions with high opportunity or administrative costs.

Although neither a necessary nor a sufficient condition, a low level of competition by suppliers in the economy contributes to the increased effectiveness of moral suasion. Indeed, companies that have been "persuaded" to adopt morally superior but more costly behaviour are less competitive and could be driven out of the market by competitors that are not fettered by such constraints if competition is too fierce.

=== Examples ===
==== Financial sector ====
The Bank of Canada defines moral suasion in central banking as "a wide range of possible initiatives by the central bank designed to enlist the co-operation of commercial banks or of other financial organisations in pursuit of some objective of financial policy". It could also be defined more generally as "a process whereby commercial banks co-operate with the central bank either for altruistic reasons or out of fear of administrative or legislative sanctions".

Formal moral suasion is characterised by explicit but noncontractual commitments to "refrain from activities judged to be in conflict with policies of the central bank". Informal moral suasion is more difficult to define and is carried through various conversations and interactions between the central bank and the commercial financial institutions during which commercial institutions can be made to understand the central bank's policy objectives on various matters.

The oligopolistic competition in the British banking sector has witnessed the success of moral suasion as a monetary policy instrument, which allows the central bank to control by persuasion and directive. Since five major banks need to be persuaded in England, a moral suasion policy instrument is very effective because noncompliers can be immediately identified and held up for censure, but in the United States there are many commercial banks and so the Federal Reserve must use legal controls to pursue the same ends.

==== Curbing inflation ====
Moral suasion has been effectively used in the management of inflation in a number of countries and is also referred to as "open mouth operations" in the financial sector. The common factor for the success of moral suasion is the trust that stakeholders have on the central bank. For example, New Zealand has experienced high inflation in the early-to-mid-1980s, but it drastically reduced as the bank managed to anchor stakeholder inflation expectation by moral suasion. Monetary policy to a great extent is the management of expectations, influencing inflation expectations of business and labour. Researchers have found that inflation expectations greatly influence future inflation and so the use of moral suasion to anchor inflation expectations has been an important instrument in reducing New Zealand's inflation rate.

Moral suasion has also been used widely and successfully to curb moderate price increases in countries as Britain and Sweden, which had a principle of democratic socialism for some time. Wage and price increases were agreed upon by representatives of the government, labour and businesses. The public ownership of the whole exercise enhanced compliance.

=== In different political regimes ===
Moral suasion could theoretically be used in any political regime but has a higher chance of being effective if the political authority is centralised and effective.

Centralisation of authority contributes to the effectiveness of moral suasion as a policy tool since it makes the government's positions clearer and more consistent. Attempts by governments to influence the behaviour of companies and citizens can therefore be understood more clearly.

Effectiveness of authority refers to the ease in which the intentions of the political executive can be transformed into legislative or regulatory action. That is important because the governments and agencies can use implied threats of price controls, additional regulation or taxation to induce certain behaviours from companies. Such threats will have credibility only if companies think that those threats will be carried out if they do not comply.

As fewness of economic agents to be persuaded is a necessary condition for moral suasion to be effective, that policy instrument is more adapted to countries with a higher concentration of suppliers, both in terms of number and of geography.

Studies suggest that moral suasion is usually not effective in environmental matters in advanced economies. It can, however, still be used for developing countries since there are still easy environmental gains that could be made without heavy-handed regulation.

=== Interaction with other policy instruments ===
Moral suasion is rarely used in isolation. Governments can use moral suasion in conjunction with a variety of other policy instruments to reach its objectives.

==== Regulation ====
Firms may alter their behaviour to reduce the probability that they will be subject to additional regulations. In fact, they may respond more to the threat of being regulated than to the actual imposition of regulations, as illustrated by the fact that US oil companies froze wholesale petrol prices when the 1991 Gulf War started although they had not been prompted to do so.

==== Price cap ====
Governments can also implicitly or explicitly threaten to establish price caps to make moral suasion more likely to succeed. That was illustrated in 1979, when the Chairman of the US Federal Reserve System, Paul Volcker, warned banks against raising prime rates above a certain level, and in the 1960s, when US President John F. Kennedy caused U.S. Steel to reverse its decision to increase prices by sharply criticizing the company.

==== Additional taxation ====
Moral suasion, in the form of public exhortation, curbed the bonuses paid to certain employees in the financial sector, without much success. The threat of additional, specific taxes was later used in conjunction with moral suasion to make compliance more likely.

==== Open market transactions and other interventions by central banks ====
Central banks and governments that let markets know what they consider ranges of "appropriate" values for its currency impact the trading of the currency, even if intervention never occurs. Central banks can buy or sell various securities if the currency value falls outside its desired range.

==== Information provision ====
Governments can choose to publish information to "shame" certain market participants into altering their behaviour. The threat of information provision, and of shaming drug companies that were charging "excessive" prices in the eyes of the US government, was used by the Clinton administration to curb increases in drug prices. The Singapore government's decision to publish comparative cost data from different hospitals to encourage them to be more efficient is also an example of moral suasion being used in conjunction with information provision.

==== Service provision ====
The threat of a public option, direct government provision of goods and services in a sector that is deemed to be underserviced, can be a powerful motivator for private companies to modify their behaviour to prevent the government from entering their market.

==== Privatisation and deregulation ====
Large monopolies, sometimes deemed to be unresponsive to citizens or consumer wishes, can be threatened with privatisation or with deregulation, depending on whether or not the monopoly is government-owned.

== Jawboning ==
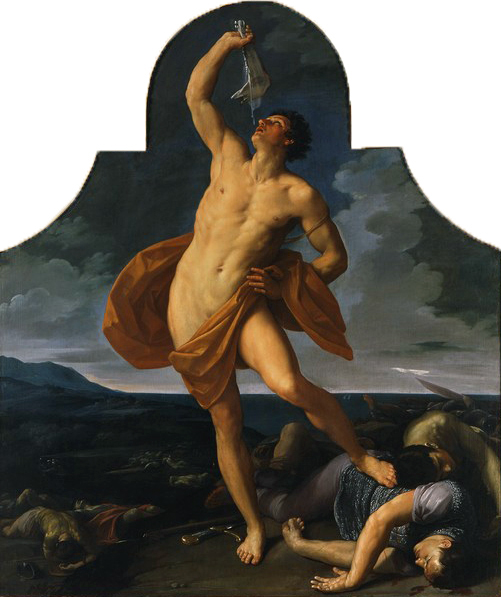
Samson depicted using the jawbone of an ass

"Jawboning" is a term applied to moral suasion in the context of economics and politics. It is the use of political authority to persuade various entities to act in certain ways, which is sometimes underpinned by the implicit threat of future government regulation. According to Canadian-American economist John Kenneth Galbraith, "jawboning" was first used to describe the activities of the US Office of Price Administration and Civilian Supply, which was formed in April 1941. However, the Oxford English Dictionary traces the earliest use of the phrase to a Time magazine article from 1969. During the Democratic administrations of Presidents John F. Kennedy and Lyndon B. Johnson, officials tried to deal with mounting inflationary pressures by establishing wage-price guideposts, and using the power of the presidency to push businesses and labor into going along with those guideposts. This attracted some derision and was often associated with the Biblical story in Judges 15:15 of Samson slaying a thousand of his enemies using the jawbone of an ass.

=== Examples ===
- The term was retroactively applied to President Herbert Hoover's efforts to convince employers to keep wages high as prices fell during the Great Depression. Hoover was successful in obtaining such agreements, but they did little to alleviate unemployment.
- During the 2000 US presidential election, then-Republican presidential candidate George W. Bush criticized outgoing President Bill Clinton for not attempting to increase oil supply and said he "must jawbone OPEC members to lower prices". This statement was later referenced by opposition party members, including Democratic presidential nominee John Kerry during the 2004 election.
- After the 2010 Deepwater Horizon oil spill, President Barack Obama successfully pressured BP into setting up an independently-managed $20 billion damage compensation fund. Obama's chief of staff at the time, Rahm Emanuel, commented that "he had a power other presidents have used - you call it jawboning."
- The 2024 Supreme Court case NRA v. Vullo involved the New York State Department of Financial Services's attempts to pressure banks and insurance companies against providing services to the National Rifle Association of America. This case is cited as limiting the power of government jawboning in matters involving First Amendment-protected speech.
- During the 2026 Iran war, analysts have referred to President Donald Trump's announcements of "positive" news (i.e. supposed peace deals) that suppress oil prices (usually backed by insider trading under the administration and global oil stockpile releases) as patterns of jawboning.

== See also ==
- Nudge theory
