= Meredith O'Rourke =

American political financier (born 1971/1972)

- Born: Meredith Michelle O'Rourke; 1971 or 1972 (age 54–55); Columbus Air Force Base, Mississippi, U.S.
- Education: Virginia Commonwealth University (BA)
- Political party: Republican
- Spouse: Husein Cumber (m. 2005; div. 2007)

Meredith Michelle O'Rourke (born 1971 or 1972) is an American political financier.

== Early life and education ==
Meredith Michelle O'Rourke was born in 1971 or 1972 on Columbus Air Force Base in Mississippi. O'Rourke is of Italian and Irish descent. She lived in Omaha, Nebraska; Dayton, Ohio; Grand Forks, North Dakota; and Philadelphia before her father moved to Virginia to work for the United States Department of Defense. When O'Rourke was eleven, she assisted her uncle in distributing flyers for Pennsylvania representative Peter H. Kostmayer, a job she credited to her interest in political campaigns. O'Rourke graduated from Woodbridge Senior High School in Lake Ridge, Virginia, in June 1990. She later graduated from Virginia Commonwealth University with a bachelor's degree. At Virginia Commonwealth, she interned at the Republican Party of Virginia doing opposition research.

== Career ==
=== Early work and The O'Rourke Group (1994–2016) ===
After graduating from Virginia Commonwealth University, O'Rourke moved to South Carolina to assist its chapter of the Republican Party in fundraising. She worked for Triad Management Services, a firm that was investigated by congressional Democrats over allegations of collusion with Sam Brownback's senatorial campaign. O'Rourke was deposed in the inquiry. She later joined the Republican National Committee. O'Rourke established The O'Rourke Group, a political fundraising firm, in 1997. By May 2004, she had become a fundraiser for the National Republican Senatorial Committee. That year, O'Rourke garnered over US$50,000 for President George W. Bush's re-election campaign. O'Rourke had additionally assisted in fundraising for Virginia senator George Allen, Florida senator Mel Martínez, and National Rifle Association president Charlton Heston. While working for Bush, O'Rourke met the fundraiser Husein Cumber, whom she later engaged. By May 2005, they had begun working for Florida attorney general Charlie Crist as he sought to become the state's governor, with O'Rourke as Crist's financial director. O'Rourke and Cumber were married following month; they divorced in April 2007.

O'Rourke helped Crist's campaign collect US$19 million in donations, as well as an additional US$37 million for the Republican Party of Florida. Following Crist's victory in the 2006 election, she became the executive director of his inauguration. After the inauguration, O'Rourke moved to Tallahassee to work for the state Republican Party. She sought to work for Arizona senator John McCain, who was expected to announce a presidential campaign. In May 2009, Florida attorney general Bill McCollum hired O'Rourke for his expected campaign in the 2010 gubernatorial election.

=== Trump campaigns and presidencies (2016–2025) ===
O'Rourke (left) attending a White House roundtable in September 2025

In 2016, O'Rourke began working for Donald Trump's presidential campaign.
