= Husein Cumber =

American businessman

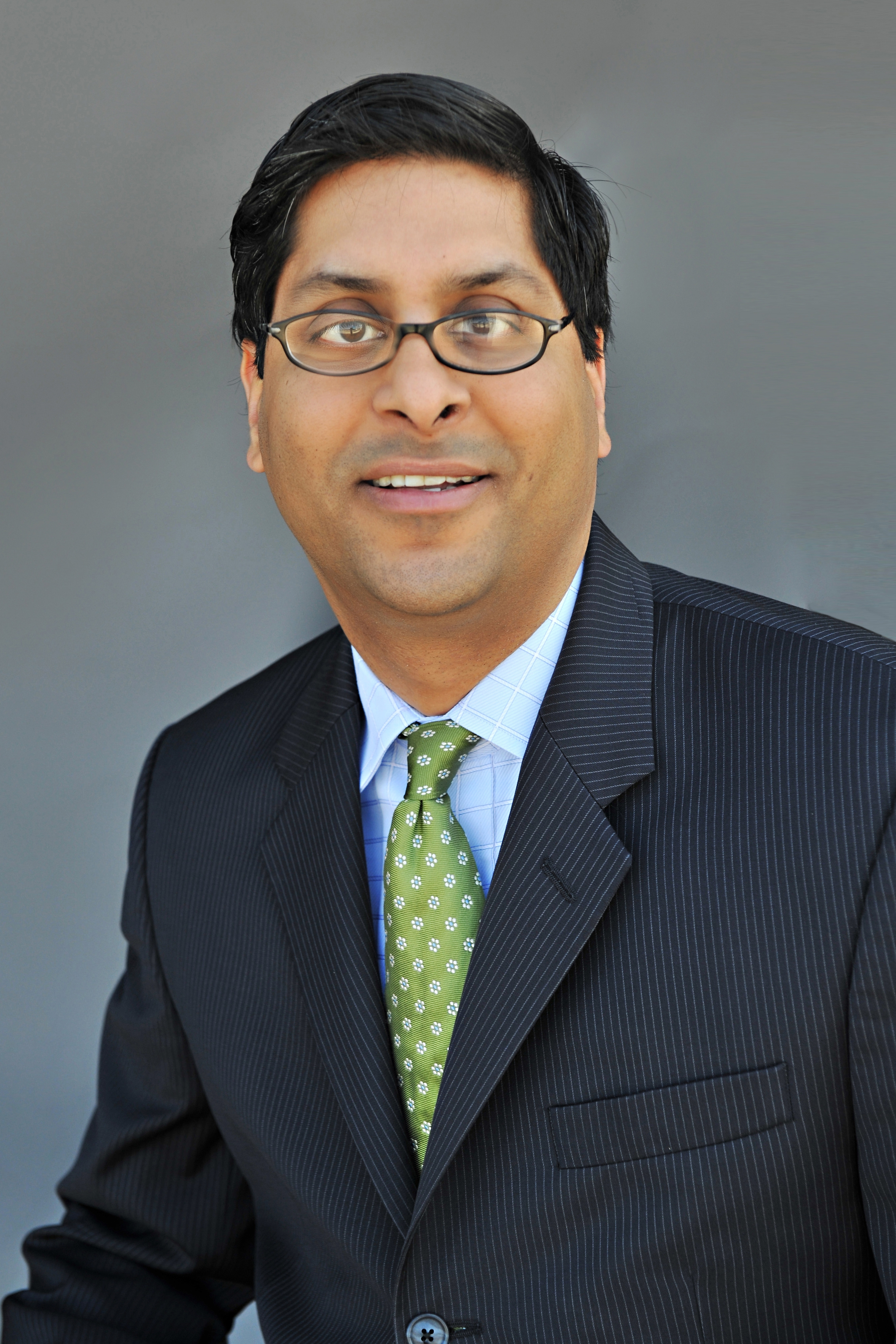
- Born: June 12, 1975 (age 51); Coral Gables, Florida, United States
- Education: Duke University
- Occupation: Senior Advisor Brightline Holdings
- Spouse: LeAnna Cumber née Gutierrez
- Children: Two

Husein Aftab Cumber (born June 12, 1975) is senior advisor for Brightline Holdings, where he was responsible for guiding the company's two major capital projects, Brightline Florida and Brightline West, from conception through development. Brightline Florida is the first privately owned and operated intercity passenger rail system in the U.S. in over 100 years. Brightline West will connect southern California to Las Vegas and will be the first true high speed rail system in the U.S.

He is also the president of H.A. Cumber & Company, Inc., a consulting firm that provides strategic consulting services in the transportation, logistics, and infrastructure sectors.

Prior to joining Brightline Holdings. Cumber was the chief strategy officer for Florida East Coast Industries, LLC. (FECI), one of Florida's largest commercial real estate, transportation and infrastructure companies. Before that he served as deputy chief of staff for the U.S. Department of Transportation (USDOT) as part of the Bush administration from 2007 to 2008 under Secretary Mary Peters.

== Early life and education ==
Cumber was born in Coral Gables, Florida to Aftab and Gul Cumber. He was raised in Coral Springs, Florida, and graduated from Marjory Stoneman Douglas High School in 1993. Cumber earned a B.A. in U.S. National Security from Duke University in 1997.

== Career ==
After college, Cumber began his career with the John D. and Catherine T. MacArthur Foundation, where he worked in the Florida real estate office. In 1997, he joined the Jeb Bush gubernatorial campaign working on both the finance and political operations in Broward and Palm Beach counties. He later served on the 1999 Inaugural Committee. Beginning in 1999, Cumber joined a government relations and business development firm as an associate, where he led the efforts to create the Network Access Point of the Americas. From 2000 to 2002 he joined Orlando-based EPIK Communications, where he managed Public Affairs and Business Development strategy.

In January 2002, Cumber was named vice president of Public Affairs at Florida East Coast Industries, then a publicly traded company on the NYSE (Ticker: FLA). He was responsible for coordinating initiatives to introduce passenger rail service along the Florida East Coast Railway corridor. Florida East Coast Industries was acquired by Fortress Investment Group L.L.C in May 2007.

== Bush administration ==
From September 2005 to January 2009, Cumber served as an assistant to the secretary of policy and as a deputy chief of staff at the United States Department of Transportation (USDOT). During his tenure as deputy chief of staff, he was part of the leadership team that oversaw daily operations of the USDOT's 60,000 employees and $67 billion budget. He co-managed over 105 political appointees, coordinated a review of a $2.3 billion railroad loan application, and implemented the U.S.-Mexico NAFTA trucking program on behalf of Secretary Mary Peters. Cumber was instrumental in the USDOT disaster response to the I-35W Mississippi River bridge.

Cumber's tenure at USDOT also included work on the creation of a new discretionary grant program to address traffic congestion throughout the U.S., a program very similar to today's TIGER discretionary grant program; the near bankruptcy of the Highway Trust Fund; several major aviation safety issues that included the grounding of part of Southwest Airlines and American Airlines' fleets for failure to comply with aviation directives; a major pipeline spill by British Petroleum on the North Slope of Alaska; the expansion of the WMATA metro system to connect downtown Washington, D.C. to Dulles International Airport; and a major passenger-freight rail collision in southern California that was the result of a Metrolink conductor texting while operating the train. The Metrolink accident resulted in the U.S. Congress passing a law that mandated the installation of Positive Train Control. President George W. Bush nominated Cumber to the United States Surface Transportation Board in 2008.

Following the second term of the Bush administration, Cumber founded H.A. Cumber & Company, a firm that focuses on business development and government relations throughout the country. The firm also provides financing and grant development services, specializing in the transportation and infrastructure sectors. Major clients of H.A. Cumber & Company include AECOM, Avangrid, GE Transportation, T.Y. Lin International, RailAmerica, R. J. Corman Railroad Group, Scheidt and Bachmann, and FedSys, Inc.

== Florida East Coast Railway ==
From 2011 to 2012, Cumber was executive vice president for corporate development at the Florida East Coast Railway, L.L.C. (FEC), an affiliate company of FECI. Cumber had responsibility for financially structuring and managing several capital projects, including reconnecting the FEC Railway to the Port of Miami, the construction of a new intermodal container transfer facility at Port Everglades, and working with public agencies to further the planning process for a new commuter rail service in the FEC corridor.

== Florida East Coast Industries ==
Cumber served as chief strategy officer at Florida East Coast Industries (FECI) from 2012 to 2025. FECI was one of Florida's largest commercial real estate, transportation and infrastructure companies and was the parent company for the Brightline Trains project. Cumber was directly responsible for guiding major capital projects from initial concept through development, including Brightline Florida, the first privately owned and operated intercity rail system in the U.S. Cumber led the initial due diligence process for Brightline while at FEC Railway and then transferred to FECI with the project in 2012. Cumber has also overseen the development of Brightline West, which will connect Las Vegas to California, which broke ground on April 22, 2024. He was instrumental in developing the strategy, leading the advocacy efforts, and securing the public financing components for Brightline West, which led to a $3 billion grant award and a $3.5 billion private activity bond allocation

== Political fundraising ==
In 2004, Cumber was recognized as being President Bush's youngest Ranger (individuals who raised $200,000 or more). Cumber has been involved in fundraising efforts for several candidates, and has personally donated heavily to Republican Party candidates.

== Boards and affiliations ==
In 2024, Cumber was appointed as an inaugural member to the Surface Transportation Board's Passenger Rail Advisory Committee. He is a current board member of the Sanford School of Public Policy at Duke University, the Florida Chamber of Commerce, and Take Stock in Children. Cumber previously served as a board member of JEA, the eighth largest community-owned electric utility company in the United States and the largest in Florida; he was also on the board of directors of the Florida State College Foundation. He is the past president of the Florida Railroad Association and past board member of the Coalition for America's Gateways and Trade Corridors. Cumber has previously served on the boards of the North Broward YMCA, the Florida Telecommunications Industry Association and the Strategic Intermodal Transportation Advisory Committee. He was a founding member of the Florida Intermodal Transportation Association and is a graduate of Leadership Florida.

== Philanthropy ==
In 2022, Cumber and his wife donated $1.825 million to the Duke University Sanford School of Public Policy, to fund a professorship focused on national security.

In 2007, Cumber donated $291,000 to his alma mater, Marjory Stoneman Douglas High School, in Parkland, Florida, to construct a football stadium on the campus in his parents' name. Stoneman Douglas opened its doors in 1990 without a football stadium. Until the completion of Cumber Stadium in the fall of 2007, the football team, the Eagles, played all "home" games at nearby Coral Springs High School.

== Personal life ==
Cumber and his wife LeAnna have two children, and reside in Jacksonville, Florida.
