= Coalition for America's Gateways and Trade Corridors =

The Coalition for America's Gateways and Trade Corridors (CAGTC) is a US interest group for transport.

It is composed of over forty representative organizations, including motor carriers, railroads, ports, engineering firms, and freight corridors that have come together to improve national freight efficiency. CAGTC was established in 2001 to bring national attention to the need to expand U.S. freight transport capabilities and to work toward solutions for this national challenge.

CAGTC plays a key role in developing consensus among members of Congress for federal investment policy that supports "intermodal connectors", "trade corridors" and "gateway access", and that provides for increases in the authorization and appropriations levels for freight and goods movement-related projects. The purpose of CAGTC is to raise public recognition and Congressional awareness of this need and to promote funding in federal legislation for trade corridors and gateways.

The following organizations are CAGTC members:

- ACS State and Local Solutions
- Alameda Corridor-East Construction Authority
- Carter & Burgess, Inc.
- Delaware River Maritime Enterprise Council
- DMJM-Harris
- Florida East Coast Railway
- Florida Trade and Transport Council
- Gateway Cities Council of Governments
- Genesee & Wyoming, Inc.
- HDR Engineering, Inc.
- HNTB Corporation
- Intermodal Association of North America
- JM Engineering, Inc.
- Los Angeles County Metropolitan Transportation Authority
- Los Angeles County Economic Development Corporation
- Majestic Realty Co.
- Mi-Jack Products Inc.
- Moffatt & Nichol
- National Association of Industrial & Office Properties
- National Association of Regional Councils
- National Corn Growers Association
- National Railroad Construction and Maintenance Association, Inc.
- Parsons Corporation
- Parsons Brinckerhoff
- Port of Long Beach
- Port of Los Angeles
- Port of Oakland
- Port of Pittsburgh
- Port of Seattle
- Port of Stockton
- Port of Tacoma
- RAILCET
- River of Trade Corridor Coalition (ROTCC)
- Riverside County Transportation Commission
- San Bernardino Associated Governments
- San Gabriel Valley Economic Partnership
- Seattle Department of Transportation
- Southern California Association of Governments
- Washington State Department of Transportation
