= Open mouth operations =

Communications by a Central Bank that affect interest rates

Open mouth operations are communications by a central bank that affect Central Bank interest rates. They are a tool of monetary policy. The term was coined by economists Graeme Guthrie and Julian Wright in the year 2000. While looking at the operations and communications of the Reserve Bank of New Zealand, these economists found that communications by the central bank had a much more significant effect on the interest rate than did Central Bank operations. Unbeknownst to most economists, Open Mouth Operations let central banks change interest rates without significantly changing their daily monetary operations. Mario Draghi's 2012 statement that “the ECB will do whatever it takes to preserve the euro, and believe me, it will be enough”, is an example of a successful Open Mouth Operation used to lower the interest rates of Spanish government bonds: following the announcement, Spanish government bond interest rates dropped 352 basis points without the ECB having to purchase them.
