= Adam22 =

American podcaster (born 1983)

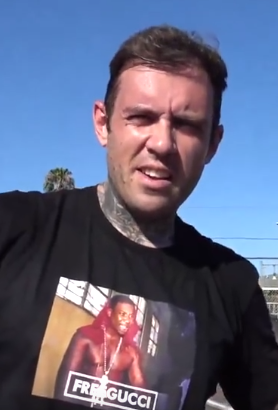
- Adam22 in 2016
- Born: Adam Grandmaison; November 24, 1983 (age 42); Nashua, New Hampshire, U.S.
- Occupations: Podcaster; YouTuber; blogger; pornographic actor; live streamer
- Years active: 2006–present
- Known for: No Jumper; ONSOMESHIT; The Come Up
- Spouse: Lena Nersesian (m. 2023)
- Children: 1

TikTok information
- Page: @adam22

YouTube information
- Channel: No Jumper
- Genre: Hip-hop
- Subscribers: 4.94 million
- Views: 1.981 billion
- Last updated: August 18, 2023
- Website: nojumper.com

Adam Grandmaison (born November 24, 1983), known professionally as Adam22, is an American podcaster and YouTuber. He is the creator and host of the hip-hop culture-oriented podcast No Jumper. In 2017, Rolling Stone described him as "underground hip-hop's major tastemaker".

== Early life ==
Grandmaison became a BMX rider at a young age and enjoyed hip-hop music, including Gucci Mane's hit "Bricks" that includes the line, "I'm ballin' like an athlete but got no jumper." This inspired the name No Jumper for his future blog and podcast.

== Career ==
=== 2006–2011: The Come Up and ONSOMESHIT ===
In 2006, Grandmaison started the BMX website The Come Up. Later, he created ONSOMESHIT, a BMX biking team and BMX-based clothing line which at one point had a retail store on Melrose Avenue in Los Angeles.

=== 2011–present: No Jumper ===
No Jumper was originally a blog on Tumblr created by George Potter. The blog, which was financed by Grandmaison, showed early interest in underground artists such as SpaceGhostPurrp and Clams Casino, and reviewed obscure Gucci Mane mixtapes, treating the underground with "critical attention".

Revived in 2015, Grandmaison's No Jumper podcast, hosted on YouTube, focuses on interviews with rap artists and pop culture figures. As of July 2026, the channel has about 2.0 billion video views. It originally started as a BMX podcast with vlogs dedicated to Grandmaison's life running ONSOMESHIT's retail store. His interview of Memphis underground rapper Xavier Wulf turned viral within hip-hop communities, sparking Grandmaison's newfound interest in interviewing figures within both underground and mainstream hip-hop.

Through Grandmaison's No Jumper podcast, he has interviewed up-and-coming talent as well as established rappers, including Lil Yachty, Lil Peep, Pouya, Juice Wrld, Pop Smoke, King Von, FBG Duck, The Migos, PnB Rock, Suicideboys, Ghostemane, Young Thug, 6ix9ine, and most notably XXXTentacion in April 2016; the latter interview having received over 23 million views as of 2026 and remains his most popular interview on the No Jumper YouTube channel.

Grandmaison also interviews a variety of artists and pop culture-oriented guests of different careers and backgrounds, including livestreamers, music executives, actors, YouTubers, music critics, and fashion designers. Notable people interviewed include Anthony Fantano, KSI, Riley Reid, "Sugar" Sean O'Malley, Aaron Carter, and Charlamagne tha God.

Rolling Stone described him as "underground hip-hop's major tastemaker" and "an advance scout searching for combustible new talent."

The No Jumper YouTube channel had over 4.7 million subscribers and about 1.7 billion total views as of June 2024. Jon Caramanica of the New York Times described No Jumper as "The Paris Review for the face-tattoo set".

Grandmaison hosted the inaugural Trap Circus music festival in Miami, Florida, in 2017.

On June 20, 2018, Grandmaison held a memorial event for rapper XXXTentacion, who had been murdered in Florida two days prior, in front of his ONSOMESHIT store in Los Angeles, with a crowd of about 300 people. The crowd soon grew to over 1,000, and police in riot gear eventually appeared in response. According to reports, rubber bullets were shot and tear gas was used to disperse the crowd.

Grandmaison was one of the promoters for YouTube personality FouseyTube's event "Hate Dies, Love Arrives", which was shut down via a bomb threat which left 1,500 people evacuated. Shortly after the event, while Grandmaison interviewed Shane Dawson, mid-interview, FouseyTube, Keemstar, Sam Pepper and Ice Poseidon interrupted, causing the interview to go viral.

During the 2022 trial of rapper Tory Lanez for his 2020 shooting of Megan Thee Stallion, No Jumper's news coverage of the event was stated to have promoted "an overeagerness to share unverified information". On December 22, 2022, the podcast's Twitter account falsely claimed that Lanez had been found not guilty on all charges. The following day, Lanez was convicted by the jury on three felony charges in respect to the shooting: assault with a semiautomatic handgun, having a loaded and unregistered firearm in a vehicle, and gross negligence in discharging his firearm.

In April 2025, Grandmaison announced that No Jumper was struggling financially and that they were laying off employees and closing their retail store in Los Angeles. It was also announced that they were selling their warehouse and relocating to a smaller workspace. Grandmaison additionally explained that two of the major reasons for the financial losses was their Instagram account being taken down and a lawsuit filed against the company by two former employees.

=== 2017–present: Pornography and other ventures ===
Grandmaison began debuting in personalized pornographic films alongside his partner Lena Nersesian (known professionally as "Lena the Plug") for the website OnlyFans in 2017, uploading a 2-minute and 16-second video to YouTube announcing a sex tape starring the two of them, to be released once his girlfriend was to reach 1 million subscribers.

In December 2019, the film was announced to be a professional pornographic film and was released for free in collaboration with Pornhub titled "Podcast Smash". The title is a reference to Adam22's No Jumper podcast and stars him and his partner Lena the Plug.

Grandmaison, along with his fiancée Nersesian, announced a new podcast in November 2021 titled Plug Talk, which focuses on interviewing pornographic film stars on OnlyFans and having intercourse with them afterward. It premiered November 16, 2021, with guest Adriana Chechik.

In February 2025, Grandmaison released a crypto meme coin on the Solana blockchain. He announced the coin on Twitter 30 minutes after it was deployed. Within hours, the coin grew from a $500k market cap to a $4 million market cap. At which point, insiders dumped their shares and the coin crashed to a $100k market cap. Grandmaison subsequently deleted his posts promoting the coin on social media. Coffeezilla, a crypto journalist who is primarily known for investigating and exposing crypto scams, referred to the coin as a pump and dump scam. He also released screenshots of text messages with Grandmaison that show that Grandmaison "knowingly" scammed his fans. In the aftermath of the controversy over his crypto coin, Grandmaison made a tweet where he expressed displeasure with how his meme coin ended up and asked for feedback from fans about what he could do to make his next meme coin better.

On January 23, 2026, Grandmaison made his boxing debut against pornographic film star Jason Luv, who has performed two sex scenes with Grandmaison's wife Lena the Plug. Grandmaison developed a feud with Luv after Luv made comments about sexually performing better with Nersesian than Grandmaison. The fight lasted only 73 seconds, with Luv winning by TKO in the first round after dropping Grandmaison twice and Grandmaison stayed down for the 10 count after the second knockdown.

== Sexual misconduct allegations ==
In 2018, Grandmaison was accused of sexual and physical assault by two women. Though he denied these accusations, Atlantic Records severed its relationship with him.

On June 1, 2023, Rolling Stone published an exposé revealing multiple women and girls—the youngest aged 16 years old—who accused Grandmaison of sexual assault, abuse, and coercion, including pressuring them to film pornographic content with him and his wife, Lena. The article cited a blog entry by Grandmaison writing about one of his alleged victims: "She was 16, but come on man, look at her. She's 18 or 19 in most of the pics here but she didn't look much different at all then. If statutory rape is wrong I didn't wanna be right." Grandmaison denied the allegations.

== Personal life ==
Grandmaison married pornographic film actress Lena Nersesian, better known as Lena the Plug, on May 18, 2023, in Tuscany. They have a daughter together, who was born on November 14, 2020. In June 2026, TMZ reported Nersesian had filed for divorce on June 1 and had requested legal and physical custody of their daughter. Nersesian later stated this was a case of alleged identity theft from a stalker, and that she never filed for divorce, nor did she intend to. On September 7, 2026, Grandmaison publicly announced his and Nersesian's formal separation. Grandmaison also clarified that they would continue to make adult content together despite the separation.

Grandmaison identifies as an atheist.

== Select discography ==
=== Singles ===
Title	Year	Peak chart positions		Album
Title	Year	US Bub.	US R&B/HH Bub.	Album
"Hard" (featuring Tay-K and BlocBoy JB)	2018	14	4	Non-album singles
"Rivals" (featuring Killy and Smooky MarGielaa)	2018	—	—	Non-album singles
