= $Libra cryptocurrency scandal =

2025 Argentine political scandal involving cryptocurrency

$Libra
Denominations
- Code: LIBRA

Development
- Latest release: 19 months ago
- Development status: Active

Ledger
- Ledger start: 19 months ago

Website
- Website: www.vivalalibertadproject.com

On February 14, 2025, Javier Milei, the president of Argentina, promoted a cryptocurrency project called $LIBRA. The price of the meme coin spiked following Milei's promotion but then suffered a severe price drop, leading to allegations of a rug pull scam and $251 million in losses for investors. This scandal has been dubbed Cryptogate. The Economist called it the "first big scandal" of Milei's presidency.

== Background ==
A week before $LIBRA's launch, Diógenes Casares, co-founder of decentralized finance company Stream Finance, wrote a report mentioning rumors that "a meme coin around Milei [was] being created," including the involvement of bribes. However, he initially thought they were not real. American analyst Nick O'Neill stated that "Javier Milei and his team worked for weeks on launching a token" and claimed "with 100% certainty" that payments were involved in the development and launch of $LIBRA.

On Friday, February 14, 2025, at 6:58 pm Argentina time, the Delaware-registered company Kelsier Ventures created the "$LIBRA" token libra (transl. pound) without publicizing the event, as part of a project called "Viva La Libertad" (transl. Long Live Freedom). The CEO of the company Kelsier Ventures, Hayden Davis, had previously met with Milei at the Presidential Palace in 2024. The one who introduced them was Mauricio Novelli, a young trader who has known Milei since at least 2021 and acted as an advisor to the president. Milei stated that he met the executives of KIP Protocol, who introduced him to the company's project called "Viva La Libertad", which aimed to fund private ventures in Argentina using blockchain technology, a claim later denied by KIP itself.

=== Key figures under investigation ===
==== Mauricio Novelli ====
Mauricio Novelli, an Argentine based in Buenos Aires, was responsible for introducing key players in the scam with the Milei administration. His work history included work at two companies which committed financial fraud and defrauded investors.

Novelli was reported to have directed the activities of Kelsier Ventures while simultaneously claiming to represent KIP and selling access to Milei to cryptocurrency investors without Milei's knowledge.

Following the scandal, Novelli's home was reported to have been raided by police following an order by the prosecutor in the case and his assets were frozen. In May 2025, footage was released by law enforcement of Novelli's mother, María Alicia Rafaele, and sister, María Pía Novelli, emptying safety deposit boxes at a bank resulting in their assets also being frozen.

==== Hayden Davis ====
Hayden Mark Davis
- Born: November 27, 1996 (age 29)
- Education: Liberty University
- Occupations: CEO, Kelsier Ventures

Hayden Mark Davis, an American cryptocurrency marketer who has been involved in a number of memecoin pump and dump schemes, was a key player implicated in the $Libra cryptocurrency scandal. Davis, as CEO of Kelsier Ventures, participated in the launch of the token. Kelsier Ventures is operated by Davis along with his brother Gideon and their father, Tom, and was initially founded during the COVID-19 pandemic. The company first advised on marketing strategies for non-fungible tokens, later focusing on cryptocurrencies and blockchain clients in 2022.

Davis was one of seven children raised by his parent, Tom Davis, in Colorado. His father, Tom Davis, counterfeited checks and assumed fake identities in his youth, spending one year in prison. Tom would later work as a minister in Colorado and headed a Christian charity for several years, going on to write five books, each investigating different subjects, like gold mining in Guyana and the sex-trade industry in Russia. Hayden's mother, Emily Davis, was born into the Church of the First Born of the Lamb of God, a polygamist Mormon fundamentalist group led by her grandfather, Ervil LeBaron. The group practiced a type of blood sacrifice, leading to the murders of both supporters and detractors of LeBaron, including Emily's father, Mark Chynoweth. At age 17, Davis sold energy drinks for Limu, a multi-level marketing company his father was involved with. He attended Liberty University for two semesters on a scholarship to play soccer as a goalkeeper for the Flames. He also founded a T-shirt printing company, interned for a private-equity firm, experimented with e-commerce, and joined a professional Spanish soccer team for short time.

Kelsier Ventures established business relationships with multiple crypto-related entities including Cube Exchange, Saturn (a Bitcoin exchange), and Ben Chow, the cofounder of Meteora (a decentralized crypto exchange). The firm partially handled the launch of the $Melania token, a memecoin created by Melania Trump two days after the initial coin offering of the $Trump token, in addition to the $Libra token. The firm has also participated in the launch of the $Enron token. Davis admitted to his involvement in "sniping" the $Melania and $Libra tokens, an illegal practice similar to front running. In April 2025, blockchain data provider Bubblemaps reported that Davis removed $100 million in liquidity from $Libra using similar strategy employed with the $Melania token.

Prior to launching Libra, Davis claimed to be an adviser to Argentine president Javier Milei, having met with him multiple times in Buenos Aires, although the Argentine government has denied any direct connection to Davis. Davis was introduced to Milei by Mauricio Novelli and Manuel Terrones Godoy. On February 17, 2025, Davis participated in an interview conducted by Coffeezilla, where Davis claimed to have profited US$113 million from the currency and denied allegations of conducting a rug pull scam. On March 13, an Argentine prosecutor sought permission to issue an Interpol "Red Notice" for Davis, stating the following: "The possibility that Davis will abandon his country of residence or hide to avoid answering for his alleged acts appears to be aggravated by the economic resources he possesses, which he can use to move or remain in hiding, hindering our investigation."

In October 2025, Davis and Chow were named in a class action lawsuit alleging that Melania Trump's memecoin, among fifteen tokens, was part of a scheme utilizing "weaponized fame to disarm diligence." In the following month, an Argentinian judge ordered the freezing of assets belonging to Davis, Favio Camilo Rodríguez Blanco, and Orlando Rodolfo Mellino, who each appeared as registered owners of virtual wallets under judicial scrutiny. The wallets contained a value estimated between 100 and 120 million dollars. Just before Davis was scheduled to appear in a New York court via a virtual hearing to evaluate a potential freezing of assets, more than $9 million worth of tokens were moved out of a wallet labeled "Milei" into various wallets on different platforms.

In December 2025, it was reported by Clarín that Davis had signed a confidential agreement with the Argentinian government, appointing him as an unpaid specialized advisor two weeks prior to the release of the $Libra token. The contract specified that Davis would provide pro bono advice on blockchain and artificial intelligence-related materials. During the signing of the document, while Davis was in Argentina, multiple transactions were made to intermediaries (as noted in a report by Argentina's Secretariat for Financial Investigation and the Recovery of Illicit Assets), linking the cryptocurrency project to him.

== Promotion by Milei ==
Three minutes after the token's creation, on Friday, February 14, 2025, at 7:01 pm Argentina time, Milei shared posts promoting the coin on his X, Instagram, and Facebook accounts. The posts described it as launching a private economic initiative to stimulate economic growth in Argentina through investment in small businesses and startups. Milei stated that the project operated under the token identifier $LIBRA and was structured to facilitate private investment in Argentine enterprises. He posted the project's associated blockchain contract address in the same message.

Immediately after Milei's post, $LIBRA's value surged from $0.000001 to $5.20 in 40 minutes. The founders of $LIBRA held 70% of the total supply, and once the price reached a certain level, they abruptly sold their holdings, crashing the price by 85%. Within a few hours, its price dropped to $0.99. The market cap (Note: The market cap of a cryptocurrency is the price of the currency times the number of coins in existence.) of $LIBRA reached $4.6 billion, then fell to only $162 million by February 15. Three hours later, the nine founding accounts had made approximately $87 million at the expense of an estimated 74,000 investors. The event has been described as being a type of scam commonly known as a "rug pull".

The tweet by President Javier Milei that launched the $LIBRA project was shared by the President of the Lower House, Martín Menem, by national deputies José Luis Espert and Damián Arabia, and also among supporters of La Libertad Avanza such as Gordo Dan, Agustín Laje, and Emmanuel Danann.

There was speculation that Milei's account might have been hacked, which was denied by members of La Libertad Avanza, such as Lilia Lemoine, and then by Milei himself when he disassociated himself from the project in a later tweet.

On February 17, after a new tweet from Javier Milei retweeting Darío Epstein, the cryptocurrency rose again, only to collapse again.

Twitter users began to use the platform's Community Notes feature to warn users about a possible rug pull scam under the initial promotional tweet.

== Retraction ==
Hours after the initial promotion, President Milei withdrew his endorsement and deleted the social media post. In a follow-up statement, he acknowledged sharing the information without properly verifying the project's details, explaining that he had no connection to the enterprise. The president characterized the incident as one of many routine social media posts he had made before in support of private enterprise initiatives. President Milei criticized political opponents he accused of attempting to exploit the situation.

At roughly the same time, the company KIP Network Inc. posted a message describing the $LIBRA project as a success and stated that President Milei had never been involved with the project's development. The message was reported to have been drafted by Mauricio Novelli who instructed that it be posted.

Hayden Mark Davis, the owner of Kelsier, published a statement declaring that he had been an advisor to the Argentine government and that the advertising campaign had been previously agreed upon with the president's team and accused Milei of "betrayal" for abruptly withdrawing his support.

== Impact ==
The number of people affected by the project is around 44,000.

Seventy percent of the total tokens were in the hands of their creators. A few accounts had profits estimated between 70 and 100 million US dollars in a few hours. According to The Economist, "it seems that insiders may have profited from prior knowledge of Mr Milei's post."

The project granted significant profits for the initial owners, who took the opportunity to get rid of the tokens when their price was high, and massive losses for many who invested after being motivated by the Argentine president. The nine founding accounts of the cryptocurrency earned about $87 million from 50,000 people who invested in it and saw its value disappear, with many media outlets describing the situation as characteristic of a scam commonly known as a "rug pull". Investors lost $251 million (in comparison, $Trump resulted in losses of $2 billion for 800,000 investors).

Several economic experts pointed out that those affected had advanced knowledge of digital currencies since, to access said cryptocurrency, it was necessary to have a wallet in Solana, a blockchain known for its low security and reduced operating costs. In addition, the purchase had to be made with the SOL cryptocurrency, which limited participation to people with prior knowledge of the ecosystem.

Mariano Biocca, a specialist in the crypto ecosystem, explained that $LIBRA belongs to a group of assets whose access is considerably complex and requires advanced technical knowledge. According to Biocca, "Up to the information we have, there was no person who exchanged pesos for $LIBRA directly," suggesting that investment in this cryptocurrency was not within reach of the general public or the middle class without prior experience.

== Political repercussions ==
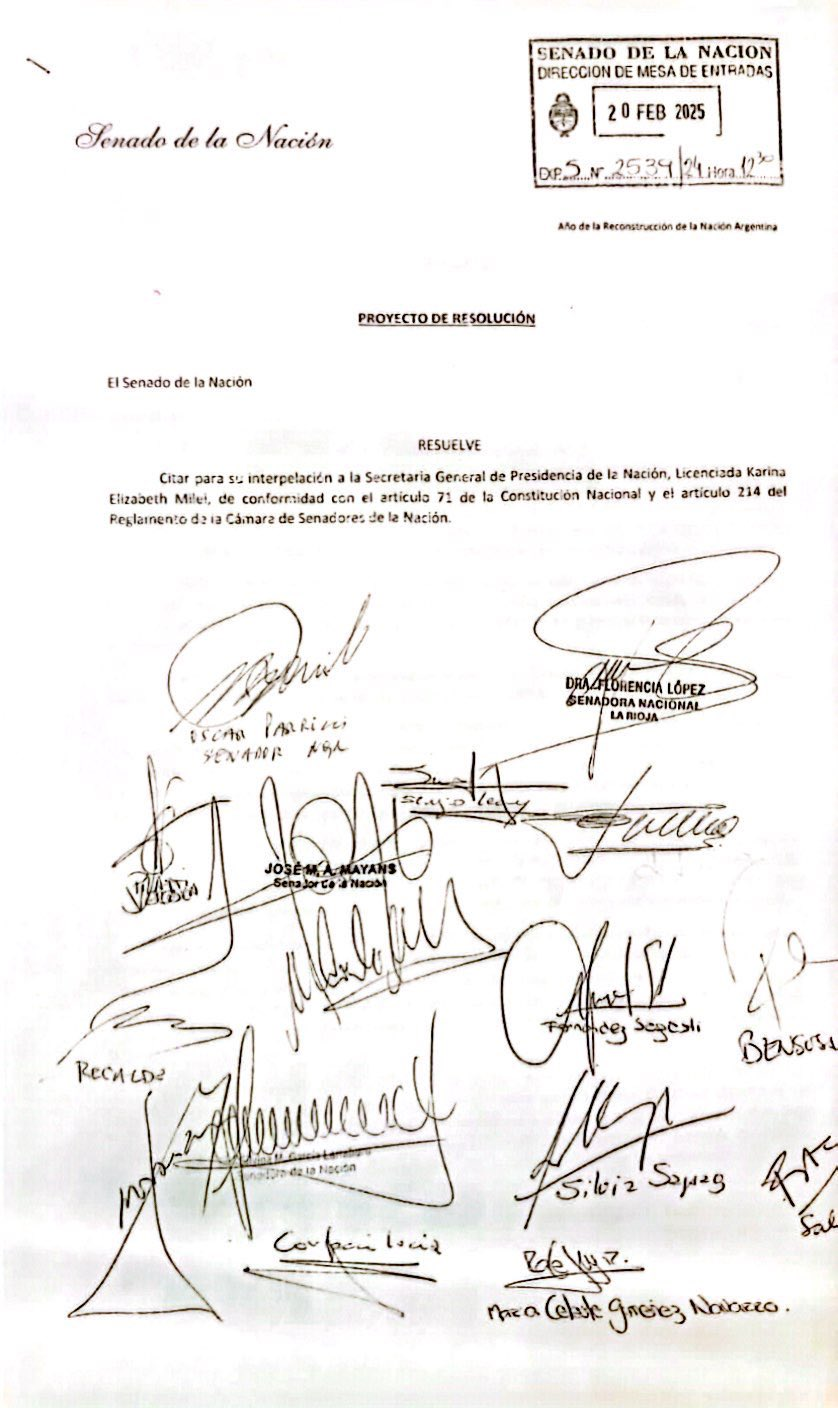
Rejected proposal to call Karina Milei to testify before the Congress.

Following the scandal, investigations suggested corruption by people linked to Milei's inner circle including Mauricio Novelli, an advisor to Milei, although Milei himself was not implicated.

The main opposition block, Union for the Homeland (UxP), has heavily criticized the president's actions and has proposed articles of impeachment in response. Socialist Party lawmaker Esteban Paulón presented a second bill to initiate impeachment proceedings. However, the initiative does not have enough supporters in the Impeachment Commission to proceed with the proposal.

The Workers' Left Front (FIT) requested the immediate appearance of Milei in the Chamber of Deputies to provide verbal reports on the promotion of the cryptocurrency. Those requests were declined by the Congress.

The Civic Coalition ARI, represented by its president Maximiliano Ferraro, distanced itself from the impeachment proposal. Ferraro stated that, although what happened was serious and could constitute crimes such as money laundering or fraud, impeachment was not the solution. Instead, he advocated for ensuring the proper service of justice and made himself available to collaborate in the relevant investigations.

Republican Proposal (PRO) expressed concern about the incident's economic impact and possible damage to Argentina's credibility. However, they rejected impeachment, calling it "opportunistic".

On Tuesday, April 8, Argentina's Chamber of Deputies approved an investigation into $Libra including requiring testimony from government officials; Milei and his sister, chief of staff Karina Milei, will not be questioned and are not implicated. In late November 2025, an Argentine congressional commission authored a report on the investigation. The commission concluded that Milei allegedly used his presidency to promote a scam, that his image was exploited for profit, and that the $LIBRA token was not his first such incident. The findings appear in a 200-page report issued after three months of lower-house deliberations, backed by opposition parties but disputed by some members of Milei’s party and the PRO. The report is not a criminal investigation and cannot make direct claims about events.

=== Previous crypto promotion ===
In 2021 as a national deputy, Milei recommended a crypto platform called CoinX. A year after Milei's recommendation, the National Securities Commission banned the financial operation for not having any authorization to offer investments and compared its operation to a Ponzi scheme. Thousands of investors were affected by CoinX and suffered millions in losses. In response to 23 Argentine Federal Police raids on offices and homes in Buenos Aires and the Santa Fe Province investigating the alleged fraud, Milei responded: "I only gave my opinion".

In 2022, Milei promoted the Vulcano Game NFT gaming project, describing it as "very interesting". In the weeks after Javier Milei's announcement, the price of the video game company's token, $VULC, went to $0.

== Possible legal consequences ==
Over 100 criminal complaints alleging fraud were filed against Milei by February 17. Most accusations were lodged by politicians aligned with Kirchnerism, and a group led by Claudio Lozano, the leader of the opposition Popular Unity party, filed charges of fraud against Milei. In the first 48 hours following Milei's initial tweet, 112 criminal complaints were filed in the Supreme Court of Argentina.

In response, Milei ordered the Anti-Corruption Bureau to determine whether any member of the national government, including himself, had misbehaved. Additionally, a new body called the "Unit for Investigation Tasks" was created within the Presidency to investigate the entire $LIBRA project.

International law firms, such as Burwick Law, proposed class action lawsuits on behalf of foreign investors who suffered significant losses following the collapse of $LIBRA. These firms sought to group affected parties from various jurisdictions to present cases in international courts, arguing that Milei's cryptocurrency promotion constituted a deceptive practice that led to detrimental investments.

== See also ==
- $Trump
- Diem (digital currency), formerly known as Libra
