= Jorge Corsi =

Argentine psychologist

Jorge Corsi (born 1948) is an Argentine psychologist who was considered one of the highest authorities in the subject of domestic violence in Argentina and Spain until he lost his prestige due to being arrested and later sentenced to prison on child sexual abuse charges. In a 2009 interview he famously stated "paedophilia is not a crime."

== Academic career ==
Corsi was Professor of Short Psychotherapies at University of Palermo, President of Argentine Association of Family Violence Prevention and the director of graduate career in Family Violence at University of Buenos Aires from 1989 to 2008, time of his 'preventive' suspension. In Spain he was Professor of the Domestic Violence interdisciplinary master program at University of Barcelona. Corsi imparted courses and seminaries around the world on male violence, where he defined that only men are capable of gender violence. The countries in which he delivered his classes include Chile, Uruguay, Nicaragua, Dominican Republic, Mexico, United States, Canada and Germany. He was also a prominent consultant for Argentine state courts.

== Sentence ==
Corsi was found guilty of integrating a pederasty band who abused underage boys and adolescents. He recorded his abuses on camera to upload the videos on the Internet, and was accused of being the leader of the group. In 2008 he had been previously imprisoned for six months in the federal prison of Marcos Paz but was released after paying a AR$100,000 penalty bond. In 2012 he was finally sentenced to serve three years in prison after a shortened trial, and was released in 2014. At the time of his sentence he had been scrutinized by the Spanish National Police because of a possible connection with a local pederasty network. As of 2017 he was working as a private passenger driver. He never attempted to return to the academic milieu.

== Books ==
- Violencia Familiar, Paidós
- Violencia masculina en la pareja
- Maltrato y Abuso en el ámbito doméstico, Paidós
- Violencias Sociales, Editorial Paidós
- Psicoterapia integrativa multidimensional, Paidós

After his abuses were made public his books were immediately removed from circulation.
