= TRB =

TRB may refer to:

- Funnelbeaker culture (Trichterbecherkultur in German), a megalithic culture
- Tap, rack, bang, a firearm technique
- Terminating Reliable Broadcast, in distributed computing
- Toll Regulatory Board, a Philippine government agency
- Tom Robinson Band, a British rock band
- Transportation Research Board, a U.S. advisory board
- TRB (writer), a ghostwriter name used in The New Republic magazine
- trb., a musical abbreviation for trombone
- Trump Rebate Banking system, a scam targeted at fans of Donald Trump
