= Jérôme Jarre =

French viner and philanthropist

- Born: June 12, 1990 (age 36); Albertville, France
- Occupations: Creator, entrepreneur, humanitarian, philanthropist
- Years active: 2013–present
- Organization: Love Army
- Known for: Vine videos

Jérôme Jarre (pronounced [ʒaʁ]) is a French entrepreneur, creator and humanitarian. He is best known for being a Vine and Snapchat celebrity. As of June 2014, he was the fourth most followed individual on Vine. That same month he became one of the first Snapchat celebrities.

After starting several businesses in China and Canada, Jarre started posting videos on Vine the day of its launch. Thereafter he left his business to completely focus on Vine. In May 2013, he co-founded GrapeStory, a talent agency for Vine and Snapchat stars.

In 2014, he turned down a $1,000,000 offer from a top NYC advertising agency because the product clashed with his principles.

In March 2017, he started a campaign for Turkish Airlines to deliver aid to Somalia, which garnered the attention of the controversial Nas Daily, Ben Stiller, Sarah Silverman, Casey Neistat, Colin Kaepernick, Juanpa Zurita, and other celebrities and influencers. As of September 2017, he helped to raise nearly $4,000,000 to aid people in Somalia suffering from a recent drought. He has posted many videos on Twitter advocating the Somali people and country.

He had more than 15 million followers across social media. but has since become anti-fame and anti social-media, seeking anonymity in order to escape the media and find himself as a human.

== Early life and education ==
Jarre was born in Albertville, France and was raised by his single mother, Agnes Jarre. At 19, he dropped out of Kedge Business School after moving to China. He stayed in China for one year and learned to speak English and Chinese, and created different startups.

== Career ==
=== Entrepreneur ===
In China, Jarre started several businesses, one of which became successful and he used the money to move to Toronto and co-founded a software company, Atendy, with Christopher Carmichael.

=== Creator ===
While he was in Toronto, he heard about Vine's launch and made an account on the platform. He then moved back to Paris, France and started making Vines while he was still managing his business and later left his business to completely focus on Vine.

==== Livestream direct cash transfer ====
Jarre partnered with the American Refugee Committee (ARC) to develop a new humanitarian model. On September 20, Love Army was invited to present their humanitarian work at the Bill & Melinda Gates foundation event GOALKEEPERS during the 2017 United Nations General Assembly. Other presenters included Bill Gates, Barack Obama, Justin Trudeau, and Malala Yousafzai. Jerome Jarre, Casey Neistat and Juanpa Zurita took the stage on behalf of Love Army and ARC. Simultaneously, the ARC team was on the ground with 1000 beneficiaries in 8 different villages gearing them up to receive a life changing mobile money transfer. In a historical first, a livestream was set up between the beneficiaries and the GOALKEEPERS event, which meant everyone there was able to see just where the money raised was going. With everything in place Jerome and his team did something that came as a surprise to everyone in attendance. With no warning, they asked Bill and Melinda Gates to help them meet their fundraising goal of $1 million. The Gates’ agreed and in moments Abdirashid Duale, the CEO of Dahabshiil who was in the audience, was able to transfer the funds from his phone live. Each and every one of the 1000 beneficiaries instantly received $1000, and the moment was captured via livestream.

=== Social media ===
==== Vine ====
Jarre posted his first Vine in January 2013 on the day Vine launched. Three months after the launch of Vine, he released a video titled Don't be afraid of love, which became one of the earliest viral videos on Vine and was featured twice on The Ellen DeGeneres Show. Six months after starting his Vine account, he had 20,000 followers. Most of his vines feature him playing pranks on strangers. According to Jarre, after being featured on The Ellen DeGeneres Show, his account grew from 20,000 followers to 1 million followers in a month. Subsequently, Ellen asked him to cover the Red Carpet ceremony of the 86th Academy Awards, where he made multiple vines with Hollywood actors. Later he was hired by Canal+ to cover 2014 Cannes Film Festival. At the Tribeca Film Festival 2014, he was one of the jurors of the 6 second films competition.

In November 2013, Jarre started a project on Vine called Humans. In this project, he asks strangers the question "what is the most important message you would like to share with the world right now?". The videos of this project have been posted under a separate Vine account, Humans. BuzzFeed's Arielle Calderon wrote of Jarre's series that "this Vine project will restore your faith in humanity."

Jarre has made many vines with several of Hollywood's artists including Robert De Niro, Pharrell Williams, Ashton Kutcher, Ben Stiller, Ansel Elgort, Beyonce, Ariana Grande and Kristen Bell.

In 2015 Jarre left Vine.

==== Snapchat ====
After gaining 7 million followers on Vine, Jarre made an account on Snapchat and started using the platform where he makes two-minute narratives for telling stories. Jarre created a snapchat story with Stromae about a carrot looking for his father (Stromae) On 11 July 2014, Jarre went outside Snapchat's office and tweeted "Hey Snapchat, I am outside your office. Let me in if you see this." The hashtag #JeromeInsideSnapchat that he used for his tweet trended at #1 in the US and the UK. He was then asked to come into the Snapchat office, where he made a Snapchat story with the CEO Evan Spiegel.

On one occasion he shared the story on Snapchat and received twenty-six million views.

==== Ugly Selfie Challenge ====
In 2015 Jarre started the #UglySelfieChallenge, inviting people to stop trying to take perfect selfies, and post selfies making silly faces; everyone had to nominate three more people to do the same. More than 100,000 ugly faces photos were published.

=== GrapeStory ===
GrapeStory is a talent agency founded by Jarre and Gary Vaynerchuk in May 2013. The agency connects mobile content artists with brands looking for marketing content. After gaining a significant following on Vine, Jarre decided to launch a talent agency for Vine, Instagram and Snapchat stars. Jarre was looking for a business partner when he learnt that Vaynerchuk was going to be in Toronto. Jarre had taught himself English by listening to an audio version of Vaynerchuk's self-help book, Crush It! when he was in China. When Jarre pitched his idea, Vaynerchuk liked it and decided to become his business partner. Jarre then left his business in Toronto and moved to New York to work on GrapeStory. As of August 2013, the agency had between 20 and 30 Vine stars signed on, among others.

=== Litre of Light (The Solar Light Mission) ===
Jarre launched a campaign where likes on the posts are currency and plastic bottles are used to light up the communities in rural Philippines. He once helped turn 150K Instagram likes into a lit up village in the Philippines.

== Controversies ==
Jarre was strongly criticized by the Vine community for posting a Vine in which he played a kiss prank on John Stamos and Stamos returned the kiss. The vine was posted in June 2014, and the commenters accused him of being gay and threatened to unfollow him for it. Jarre posted a follow-up Vine video the next day to call out these individuals directly. In it, he claimed he's not gay, then proceeded to kiss a fellow Vine star Nicholas Megalis on the mouth to show support for the LGBT community.

On January 5, 2014, Nash Grier and Jarre turned up at a mall in Kópavogur, Iceland to meet their fans. The meet up was organized by the two of them on the social media a day before. They wanted to do a free meet-up, so decided against booking a venue and hiring security. Over 5,000 people gathered there and the police had to be called after the crowd became unmanageable. Minor injuries and damages to the parked cars were also reported. Later Jarre posted an apology on Twitter.
