= Save the Kids token =

2021 cryptocurrency fraud incident

Save the Kids
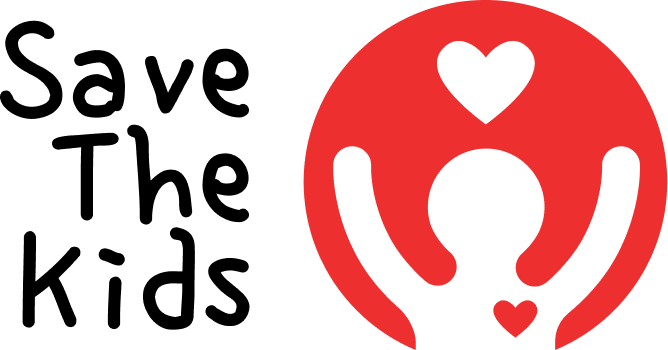
- Official logo of Save the Kids

Denominations
- Code: KIDS

Development
- Original author(s): Frazier Khattri (FaZe Kay) and Sam Pepper (both alleged)
- Initial release: June 5, 2021; 5 years ago
- Development status: Defunct
- Developer: Anonymous (identified as "Lucas")

Website
- Website: savethekids.io (archived)

Save the Kids was a cryptocurrency token and pump and dump scheme launched in 2021, which was marketed as a charity token meant to give a percentage of the transaction fee to a Binance-operated charity. The token was widely publicized by YouTube personalities, including RiceGum and members of FaZe Clan who were later removed, in the time leading up to its launch.

== Background ==
Save the Kids was developed by an individual named Lucas, who disclosed that the project was first formed by two individuals named "Manny" and "H.", whose full names he could not disclose for legal reasons. Lucas claimed when he was originally recruited to develop, he initially believed the charitable intentions of the founders, though later learned that the founders were going around bringing on board several social media influencers to market the coin. Lucas additionally added that he was initially concerned Manny and H. were part of a larger group who were working to fund further pump and dump schemes.

The pump and dump aspect was caused by the token's anti-whaling mechanism, which is intended to prevent larger stakeholders from selling a large part of their funds. The site initially described that any single holder who owned over 0.5% of all tokens would be designated as a "whale", who could only sell 20% of their total supply every 24 hours in 0.1% transaction limits until they no longer held 0.5% of all supply. However, it was later discovered that the code had been tweaked when the coins went live to change the time limit from 24 hours to 60 seconds, enabling whales to quickly sell or "dump" all of their holdings.

=== Promotion ===
Save the Kids was widely promoted by commentator RiceGum, Xcademy founder Joel Morris, and model Sommer Ray, as well as FaZe Clan members Kay (Frazier Khattri), Jarvis (Jarvis Khattri), Nikan (Nikan Nadim), and Teeqo. Many of the influencers appeared in videos promoting the token and made numerous tweets encouraging their fanbase, mostly consisting of teenagers, to purchase the token.

== Launch ==
Save the Kids was launched on June 5, 2021, and traded on the PancakeSwap exchange under the symbol $KIDS, starting around US$0.02. Immediately, though, the price of tokens collapsed to less than half a cent and further declined to price the token around $0.00138 at the start of July 2021. According to YouTuber Coffeezilla, the crash of Save the Kids was caused by Jarvis selling two-thirds of his coins, Nikan selling one-third of his holdings, and Kay selling nearly his entire collection of tokens, predicted by Coffeezilla to be valued around US$80,000.

== Aftermath ==
After the scandal broke, the Save the Kids website was taken offline, and various influencers removed their tweets on the incident. Binance themselves addressed the controversy saying that they do not accept donations from altcoin campaigns, disproving Save the Kids's claim that they had donated over US$80,000 to the charity. The project is believed to have been abandoned.

=== Coffeezilla investigation ===
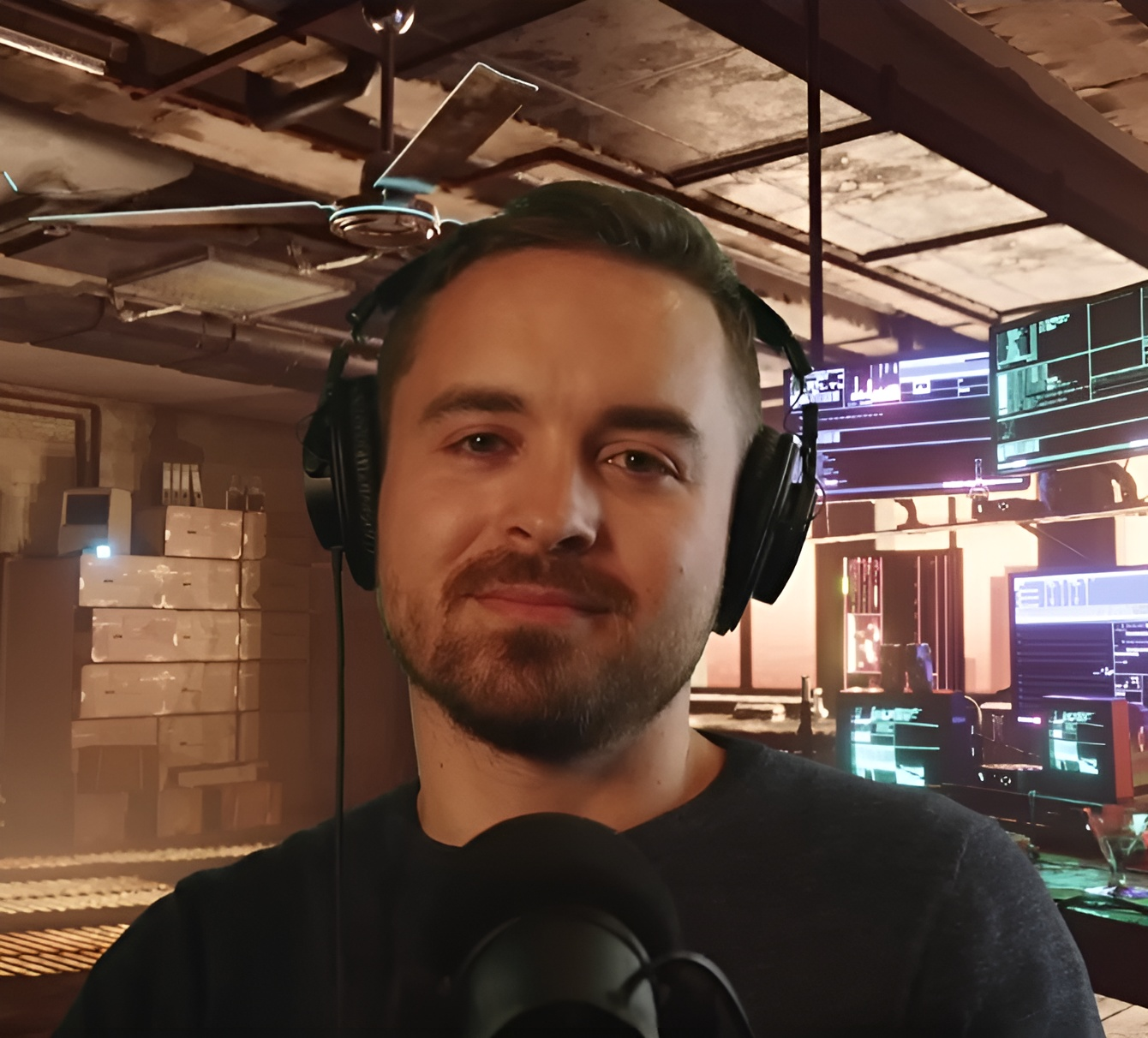
YouTuber Coffeezilla is considered to be one of the primary investigators into Save the Kids

YouTuber Stephen Findeisen, known online as Coffeezilla, conducted an investigation into the entirety of the Save the Kids scandal. Ultimately, Findeisen found that Manny was only a middleman behind the scandal and that most influencers who promoted the currency were connected with it through their managers. The primary architects of the scheme were Frazier Kay, who had used several cryptocurrency wallets to potentially hide his tracks, Jordan Galen, a manager and promotion finder for Kay and various other members of FaZe Clan, and YouTube personality Sam Pepper. Findeisen eventually uncovered that Lucas had changed the anti-whale mechanism on orders from Pepper, and that Kay was one of the main architects of the Save the Kids. It was also suggested in Findeisen's videos that Kay and Pepper broke ties during the launch of Save the Kids, a possible motive for Pepper to order that Lucas change the anti-whale mechanism, a claim Kay continues to make. However, Kay additionally stated to Findeisen that he knew nothing about cryptocurrency, which Findeisen debunked by stating Frazier had multiple cryptocurrency wallets with one having hundreds of different cryptocurrencies.

=== FaZe Clan ===
FaZe Clan management tweeted that they were completely unaware of the actions of its members and did not support them, posting that Kay had been expelled from the group entirely while Jarvis, Nikan, and Teeqo would be suspended until further notice; the latter of whom would later be reinstated after it was discovered that he had not sold any of his holdings. Kay responded by saying that though he had admitted he should have vetted his promotion through FaZe Clan initially, he had absolutely no involvement in the scandal and promoted the coin with a belief that it would help the world for the better, though Findeisen, after conducting his investigation, discovered Kay had a history of promoting altcoins. After his expulsion from FaZe Clan, Kay claimed he had been scared himself and was planning to pursue legal action against Findeisen. Kay additionally promised that he would pay back as many people as possible who lost their money to the token, claiming that he had lost $37,000 himself (which was adjusted in March 2022 to total around US$500,000), and further vowing to embargo Pepper on a personal and professional level.

=== Save the Children ===
Save the Children had issued a statement to Findeisen stating that the charity had no affiliations to Save the Kids and they also issued a similar statement in 2023.

== Legacy ==
The scandal has been commonly cited as a textbook example of the cryptocurrency influencer scam and serves as a warning for other influencers to refrain from participating in or endorsing digital assets. Frazier Khattri has encouraged influencers after Save the Kids to refrain from endorsing cryptocurrency, saying that the crypto market has "not fully developed". Save the Kids was additionally credited as one of the focus examples for the growing trend of cryptocurrency scams, to which more than $80 million has been lost so far mostly from younger audiences buying into the currencies simply from the hype.
