= Turner Free School =

Location
- Tile Kiln Lane; Cheriton; Folkestone, Kent, CT19 4PB; England
- Coordinates: 51°05′28″N 1°08′56″E

Information
- Type: Free school
- Local authority: Kent County Council
- Trust: Turner Schools
- Department for Education URN: 145923 Tables
- Ofsted: Reports
- Principal: Kristina Yates
- Gender: Co-educational
- Age: 11 to 18
- Enrollment: 478 (September 2021)
- Website: www.turnerfreeschool.org

Turner Free School is a co-educational secondary school located in the Cheriton area of Folkestone in the English county of Kent.

The school is located at the former site of Pent Valley Technology College.

== History ==
=== Pent Valley ===
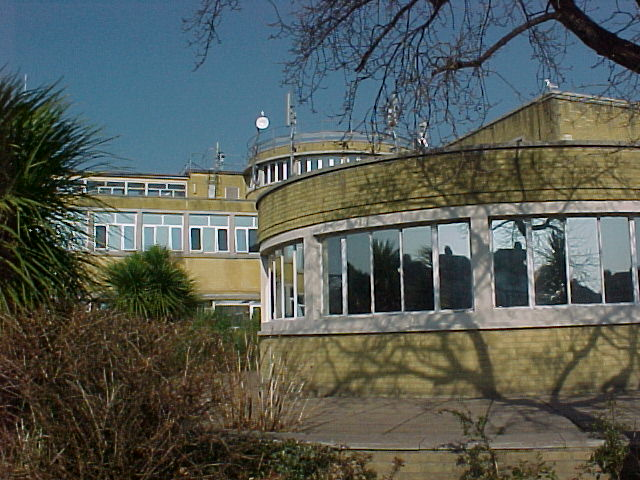
Pent Valley Technology College

The school was originally opened in 1938 as Harcourt Secondary School for girls. In 1972 Harcourt Secondary School for Girls, Harcourt Primary School and Morehall Secondary School for Boys merged to form Pent Valley Secondary Modern School. The school attracted pupils from Folkestone, Hawkinge and Hythe (Some students even travelled over ten miles to get to the school).

The school was granted Technology College status in 2003 and was renamed Pent Valley Technology College. A new sports hall was opened by Colin Jackson in 2005.

In 2011 plans were announced to demolish the school in order to regenerate the original building. All plans were postponed because of a government spending review. In December 2015 Kent County Council launched a consultation on the closing the school due to declining pupil numbers. The school was closed down in July 2017.

=== Turner Free School ===
Kent County Council sold the old school site to the Turner Schools Multi-Academy Trust, who announced that they would ultimately open a new secondary free school on the site with additional new buildings. Turner Free School opened to year 7 pupils in September 2018, and permission was granted for the new build in October 2019. The new build was completed in May 2021.

== The school today ==
Turner Free School is a non-selective free school sponsored by Turner Schools. The school offers GCSEs and BTECs as programmes of study for pupils, and plans to open a sixth form provision in 2023.

== Notable former pupils ==
=== Pent Valley ===
- Lloyd Blackman - Footballer
- Jeremy Goss - Former Norwich City footballer
- Sam Pepper - Former housemate in Big Brother 2010
- Péter Szilágyi - Hungarian politician
