= Ice Poseidon =

American live streamer (born 1994)

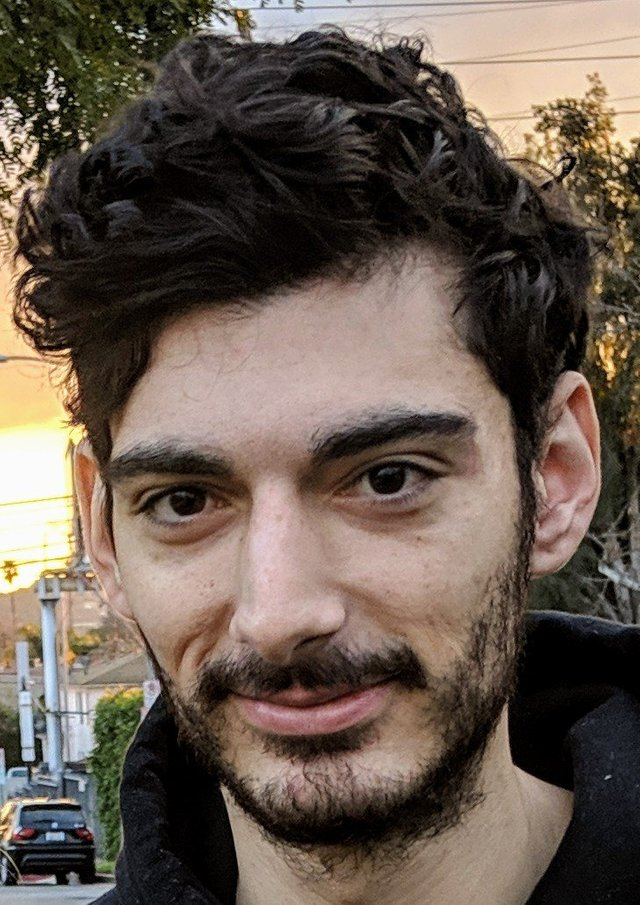
- Denino in 2019
- Born: Paul Michael Joseph Denino; September 29, 1994 (age 32)
- Occupation: Broadcaster
- Organization: Kick
- Height: 6 ft 3 in (191 cm)

Kick information
- Channel: iceposeidon
- Years active: 2023–present
- Followers: 215,000

Twitch information
- Channel: Ice_Poseidon
- Years active: 2015–2017
- Followers: 296,000

YouTube information
- Channel: Ice Poseidon
- Years active: 2015–2023
- Subscribers: 691,000 (March 5, 2026)
- Views: 100,242,522 views (December 13, 2025)
- Website: iceposeidon.com

Paul Michael Joseph Denino (born September 29, 1994), better known as Ice Poseidon, is an American Internet personality, live streamer, and YouTuber. He is primarily known for streaming the video game Old School RuneScape and his IRL streams. Denino gained peak prominence in 2017 when his IRL streams became popular. He is best known for his IRL streams, which he describes as "life streaming". Rolling Stone recognized Denino as a "pioneer 'life streamer'".

Initially a streamer on Twitch, Denino was publicly banned from the platform for being swatted off an airplane at Phoenix airport after a viewer called in a bomb threat under Denino's name. Following several years of streaming on YouTube, Denino moved to Mixer, until the streaming platform shut down in July 2020. On May 6, 2023, Denino started streaming on Kick.

Denino admitted to taking over $500,000 in funds from the liquidity pool of CXCOIN, a cryptocurrency pump and dump scheme, profiting him over $300,000. Denino stated his intention to reimburse $150,000 to the investors he had defrauded; however, reports indicate that only $50,000 have been verified as returned to the token holders.

On June 28, 2023, Denino was arrested in Bangkok after he live-streamed himself giving his girlfriend a lap dance, and charged for violating Thailand's anti-pornography laws. Denino published an apology video on his Twitter promptly after being arrested. On August 18, 2023, Denino revealed that criminal charges against him had been dropped and that he had left Thailand.

== Streaming career ==
=== Twitch ===
Denino was a partnered streamer on Twitch. He rose to prominence for his Old School RuneScape streams in 2015 playing under the pseudonym "Ice Poseidon", which he created using a random name generator when he was twelve years old. He moved into streaming IRL, beginning by streaming himself playing Pokémon Go. He was banned multiple times on Twitch. In late December 2016, Twitch announced the launch of the IRL section. Denino during this time would also decide to move to California to pursue his Twitch career full-time. He frequently traveled around the USA IRL streaming, averaging thousands of concurrent viewers.

==== Permanent suspension from Twitch ====
He was permanently banned from Twitch on April 28, 2017, after being swatted on American Airlines Flight 458 from Los Angeles to Phoenix while live streaming on the platform. Police officers removed Denino and another person from the plane after landing in Phoenix. The incident made national news across the US, as a hoax bomb threat had been called in by one of Denino's viewers under his name. While this was not the first time he had been swatted during a livestream, it was the first on Twitch to lead to a permanent suspension.

The decision to ban Ice Poseidon from Twitch sparked controversy, with some believing his ban was unjustified, including Denino himself. Some members of the community demanded that Twitch undo the ban, citing complaints that the Twitch terms of service were too vague and with Denino stating, "When you look at the terms of service, there was no rules saying that you shouldn't leak your location".

=== YouTube ===
Following his ban from Twitch in spring 2017, Denino took to YouTube, taking most of his fans (the "Purple Army") with him, a rarity for streamers.

Denino's fanbase is controversial, with some describing the community as 'toxic' due to their frequent use of racial and sexual slurs and harassment. His community is largely based on his sizeable Discord community, which had 92,000 members as of April 2024. His Reddit subreddit /r/Ice_Poseidon was initially placed under "quarantine" by Reddit and subsequently banned in October 2019, along with its community-run sister Subreddit /r/Ice_Poseidon2. Denino admits that it is nearly impossible to hide anything from the "Purple Army".

Denino quickly became one of the most popular livestreamers in the world focusing primarily on the IRL genre, using a mobile broadcasting rig of his own design. His streams are known for their 'edgy' humor and interaction with viewers through text-to-speech and with viewers meeting him in public by determining his location, a process known as 'stream sniping'. Denino's openness about his life has led to multiple incidents in public due to viewers calling and harassing nearby store owners, making baseless threats and warning that Denino is a risk to provoke violence or to have police called on Denino.

During Denino's trip to Europe, he visited Zürich, Switzerland, and was featured in a tabloid magazine that discussed his being evicted from multiple hotels for harassment and disobeying filming laws of the country.

His continual swatting provoked a debate within the streamer community on whether such content should no longer be publicized due to the media contagion effect which might encourage more people to swat him, and as a result many Twitch/streamer communities banned the posting of swatting clips.

On the morning of March 21, 2019, Denino's residence in Los Angeles was raided by the FBI, and his Cx Network subsequently folded in March 2019.

=== Mixer ===
On August 1, 2019, Denino started streaming on Microsoft's streaming platform, Mixer. He stated that he was trying out Mixer in comparison to YouTube and that Mixer's community and active staff support made the community much more welcoming than YouTube. Another reason given for the platform switch was that "YouTube has only downgraded their streaming discoverability over the years which sucks for the streamers." During the week of January 20 to 24, 2020, Denino hosted Mixer's first 5-day long game show called "Scuffed Brother", featuring other Mixer streamers and partners. The reality event imitated CBS's Big Brother, where contestants are locked in a house and compete for money. The event was a success, with the 5 days racking up 500,000,000 sparks from viewer voting and 350,000 views. As of June 12, 2020, Ice Poseidon had 39,995 followers and 2,225,145 total views. On June 22, 2020, Mixer announced it was shutting down and partnering with Facebook Gaming.

=== Kick ===
On December 7, 2022, Denino joined the Kick livestreaming platform. On the Kick platform, he also began streaming casino games and gambling in general, something that is prohibited on other platforms.

==== Arrest in Thailand ====
In June 2023, Denino and several others were arrested in Bangkok, Thailand. The incident occurred during a live broadcast on Kick, in which Denino performed an explicit lap dance for his girlfriend at a hotel restaurant. This act was deemed disrespectful by the hotel's management.

The hotel's general manager confronted Denino and his group, leading to their arrest by local authorities. Denino was charged with "distribution of obscene content", a serious offense under Thailand's Computer Crime Act. He faced the possibility of up to five years in prison.

Following his arrest, Denino spent time in a Thai jail before posting bail, which cost him $12,000. He described the conditions in the jail as extremely harsh.

As of mid-2024, Denino's legal situation had improved, with reports indicating that the charges against him were dropped. Denino later revealed that he had bribed and blackmailed officials, and said he would have committed suicide in Thai prison.

==== Arrest in Australia ====
On September 21, 2023, during a stream in Queensland, Australia, Denino and frequent stream collaborator Sam Pepper invited an escort for $500 to enter his hotel room, with the intent of streaming the escort interacting with another local streamer Robot Andy as part of a prank. They agreed on an extra fee to record the interaction, and the camera livestreaming was pointed out to the escort immediately as she entered the room. Ed Craven, founder and owner of the streaming platform Kick, was active in the stream chat while this was unfolding, sending laughing emotes. After being made aware of the situation via text message from a friend, the woman attempted to leave the hotel room but was temporarily blocked by the third streamer Robot Andy, who chased after her. Later, Denino and Pepper exited the hotel and were apprehended by police officers, who placed them under arrest for sexual assault. They were later released without charge.

==== Actions in South Korea ====
In April 2025, Denino and several others in Busan, South Korea, kicked trash, mocked Korean cuisine, and mocked an elderly taxi driver. Denino reportedly claimed that "Japan gave good genes to Korea through comfort women", referring to ethnic Korean women pressed into sexual slavery by Japan during World War II.

== Esports ==
=== NRG ===
From September 2016 Denino was affiliated with the eSports organization NRG Esports as part of their Old School RuneScape roster and as a content creator. The sponsorship provided management services through team NRG's Brent Kaskel. In June 2019, Denino announced he was no longer working with Kaskel after allegations of sexual abuse were made against Kaskel. Denino earned about US$60,000 per month through various sponsorships.

== CxCoin scheme ==
Denino launched in July 2021 a cryptocurrency he called "CxCoin" named after the "Cx" signature of his live-stream following. The cryptocurrency token aimed to allow streamers to "receive support" despite previously admitting in an earlier YouTube stream that he would use cryptocurrency to scam unsuspecting buyers out of their money. The coin was advertised as a long-term hold asset, however, in January 2022, Paul admitted to scamming over $500k from his fans in a pump and dump crypto scheme by removing funds from the liquidity pool as well as withdrawing from the pre-sale and marketing wallet, netting Denino about $300k after paying close to $200k to developers.

Denino remains widely criticized for showing no remorse after the scheme caused losses for investors and fans. In an exposee interview by YouTube crypto-journalist Coffeezilla, Denino states "If you want the answer, yeah I could give the money back, it is within my power, but I am going to look out for myself and not do that." Denino later denied the project was a scam arguing he did not advertise the project to casual fans and defended his withdrawals from the liquidity pool. Denino later promised that $150k of the funds withdrawn would be returned to the liquidity pool however, only $47k were accounted to be returned. The CxCoin website permanently went offline between June 18 and August 30 2022.

== Other ventures ==
On November 19, 2022, Denino made his professional boxing debut against Brandon Buckingham at the Moody Center, in Austin, Texas. Buckingham defeated Denino via first round knockout.

Denino took part in the first ever tag team boxing match on March 4, 2023 in the Telford International Centre in Telford, England. Denino's partner was Anthony Vargas and their team name was 'D-Generation Ice'. Their opponents were Luis Alcaraz Pineda and BDave named as 'Los Pineda Coladas'. They lost after Pineda and BDave both hit a flurry of shots onto Denino causing the referee to stop the bout, leading Denino and Vargas to lose via TKO.

== Boxing record ==
=== Professional ===
1 fight	0 wins	1 loss
By knockout	0	1

No.	Result	Record	Opponent	Type	Round, time	Date	Location	Notes
1	Loss	0–1	Brandon Buckingham	KO	1 (4), 2:13	Nov 19, 2022	Moody Center, Austin, Texas, U.S.	MF–Professional bout

=== Tag team ===
1 fight	0 wins	1 loss
By knockout	0	1

No.	Result	Record	Team	Opponents	Type	Round, time	Date	Location	Notes
1	Loss	0–1	D-Generation Ice (with Anthony Vargas)	Los Pineda Coladas (Luis Alcaraz Pineda & BDave)	TKO	2 (4), 0:50	Mar 4, 2023	Telford International Centre, Telford, England	

== Awards and nominations ==
Year	Award Show	Category	Result	Ref
2016	Golden Gnome Awards	Best OSRS streamer	Nominated	
2017	Esports Industry Awards	Streamer of the year	Nominated	
