= Péter Szilágyi (politician) =

Hungarian politician

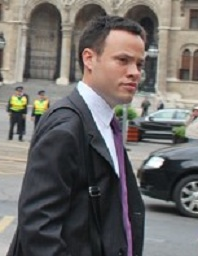

Member of the National Assembly
- In office 14 May 2010 – 5 May 2014

Personal details
- Born: 6 January 1981 (age 45) Budapest, Hungary
- Party: LMP (2009–2013); PM (2013– )
- Profession: jurist

Péter Zoltán Szilágyi (born 6 January 1981) is a Hungarian jurist and politician, member of the National Assembly (MP) from Politics Can Be Different (LMP) National List between 2010 and 2014.

He finished his secondary studies in the Calvinist College of Sárospatak and the Pent Valley Technology College in Folkestone, United Kingdom. He graduated as a jurist from the Pázmány Péter Catholic University in 2005. He is a founding member of the LMP since Spring 2009. He was elected as Member of Parliament from the party's National List in the 2010 parliamentary election. He was appointed one of the recorders of the National Assembly on 14 May 2010. He had been a member of the Committee on Immunity, Incompatibility and Mandate since 14 May 2010 and Committee on Local Government and Regional Development since 2 November 2010.

In January 2013, the LMP's congress rejected against the electoral cooperation with other opposition forces, including Together 2014. As a result, members of LMP’s “Dialogue for Hungary” platform, including Szilágyi, announced their decision to leave the opposition party and form a new organization. Benedek Jávor said he eight MPs leaving LMP would keep their parliamentary mandates. The leaving MPs established Dialogue for Hungary as a full-fledged party.
