= Ben Phillips (YouTuber) =

Welsh YouTuber (born 1992)

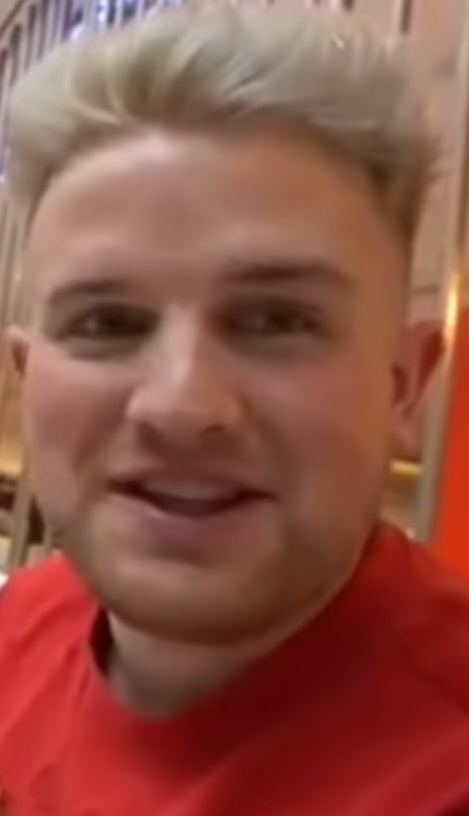
- Phillips in 2018
- Born: 1992 or 1993 (age 33–34)
- Occupation: YouTuber
- Children: 1

YouTube information
- Channel: benphillipsuk
- Years active: 2014–present
- Genre: Pranks
- Subscribers: 4.49 million
- Views: 1.298 billion
- Last updated: June 2026

Ben Phillips (born 1992 or 1993) is a Welsh YouTuber. He began uploading videos on Vine in 2013, gaining an online following with a series of clips featuring his son Harley. After leaving the platform in 2015, he has uploaded videos on Facebook and YouTube, primarily about pranks involving his friend Elliot Giles. Phillips went on a theatrical tour in 2016 and was given a prank-show pilot on Comedy Central in 2017. He also uploads videos to TikTok.

== Career ==
Phillips set up his Vine account in August 2013 and initially uploaded videos of his three-year-old son Harley. He began a "Dr Harley" series in which his son gave out spoof medical advice. In February 2014, they were one of the top 5 viners in the United Kingdom with half a million followers. They were signed by social media agency GrapeStory which was co-founded by Jérôme Jarre. After he and his son's mother broke up, he began to make vines on his own and also upload videos to Facebook. The last vine he did with his son was a Ford Europe advert which he was paid £12,000 to make.

Phillips' team consisted of his friends and family who would give him ideas which he called "the Peter Andre model". In March 2015, a couple of days after being interviewed by Newsbeat and BuzzFeed News, he claimed his Vine account was hacked. Phillips moved to YouTube making videos primarily about pranking his friend Elliot Giles such as replacing his hair gel with superglue, putting Viagra in his sports drink and placing him in a lake whilst he was sleeping on an inflatable mattress. He said of Vine's closure in 2017 that "Vine just didn't keep with the creator and the influencer" and that "they lost sight of what Vine actually was. YouTube and Facebook have so much more to offer the creator now."

In 2016, he went on a theatrical tour in the United Kingdom, Australia and Asia and produced a movie featuring footage of the tour that was shown in cinemas in the United Kingdom, the United States and Australia. When asked about his following in Asia, he said that his philosophy was making his videos "universal so you didn't have to understand the language to get the videos". His slogan "sorry bro!" was the title of his book published in 2016. In 2017, he was given a prank show pilot on Comedy Central titled Ben Phillips Blows Up.

In 2019, a video by Phillips in which Giles is blindfolded on a railway line as part of a Bird Box challenge was investigated by police. The British Transport Police said that Giles was "quite literally playing a game of life and death". In February 2021, YouTuber Jake Paul told Forbes that he had discussed creating a cryptocurrency with Phillips. In February 2022, Phillips and Paul were named in a class-action lawsuit against SafeMoon, a cryptocurrency they had promoted, which claimed they were involved in a "pump and dump" scheme.

== Personal life ==
Before becoming a Viner, Phillips worked in his mother's shoe shop in Bridgend, Wales. He has a son called Harley.
