= SafeMoon =

Defunct cryptocurrency technology company and token

Safemoon
- Founded: 2021
- Defunct: 2023
- Headquarters: Pleasant Grove, Utah, US
- Area served: Global
- Key people: Braden John Karony (CEO)
- Products: Cryptocurrencies
- Number of employees: 100+
- Website: www.safemoon.com

SafeMoon LLC was an American cryptocurrency and blockchain company created in March 2021. The company created the SafeMoon token (SFM) which traded on the BNB Chain blockchain. The token charged a 10% fee on transactions, with 5% redistributed (or reflected) to token holders and 5% directed to wallets in a different currency, Binance Coin (BNB), controlled by the coin's authors. The token reached its all-time high market cap in April 2021 of $17b.

The SafeMoon company released a minimal-function cryptocurrency wallet and announced plans to release other cryptocurrency products. The company and the token have been the subject of several controversies: having been compared to a ponzi-scheme, not delivering on products, having multiple class-action lawsuits filed against them, and facing serious fraud allegations.

In November 2023, the SEC and the United States Department of Justice charged SafeMoon and its executive team with fraud, the unregistered offering of securities, and money laundering. In December 2023, SafeMoon declared Chapter 7 bankruptcy, and as a part of this process was acquired by the VGX Foundation. The company has since been defunct, and all operations have been ceased.

== History ==
SafeMoon
- SafeMoon logo

Denominations
- Code: SFM

Development
- White paper: Whitepaper
- Code repository: Safemoon.sol
- Development status: Discontinued
- Developer: SafeMoon US LLC

Ledger
- Block explorer: SafeMoon V2: BscScan
- Supply limit: SafeMoon V1: 1,000 Trillion; SafeMoon V2: 1 Trillion

Website
- Website: safemoon.com

=== 2021: SafeMoon version 1 ===
SafeMoon was released in March 2021. A compound of "Safe" and "Moon". The token was released with the slogan of landing "Safely to the moon", derived from the slang phrase used in the cryptocurrency community; "To the moon" which is used to describe a crypto token "to quickly rise in price". The token had no utility and team when it was launched. Upon release, Vice reported that between 14 March and 21 April 2021, SafeMoon increased in value by 23,225% following celebrity endorsements from musicians Lil' Yachty and Nick Carter, YouTuber Logan Paul, social media hype, new exchange listings, and retail investors. At that time, Vice said that "cryptocurrencies like SafeMoon still have no real-world use." These celebrities were later sued by many SafeMoon investors as part of a class-action lawsuit branding SafeMoon to be a part of a pump and dump scheme. After the substantial rise in price, the unknown developers of the token appointed Braden John Karony as the CEO of Safemoon and registered as a Limited liability company with aims of providing utility to the token. Before this appointment, Karony served as a former analyst for the United States Department of Defense from January 2015 to January 2021.

In May 2021, SafeMoon announced making a presentation to The Gambia to provide "technology for innovation and learning purposes". The project was dubbed "Project Pheonix" (the misspelling of Phoenix being intentional), SafeMoon released a familiar crypto pitch of serving the "unbanked" and claimed to be working with local governments to adopt the token as a local currency. A company run by John Karony's mother ECG LC, was set up in May 2021 to deliver this project. On 27 August 2022, John stated that his reasons for discontinuing his work in West Africa were due to supply chain problems, which is disputed by his mother in the ongoing Project Pheonix lawsuit.

In June 2021, the project began beta testing of the SafeMoon wallet. The app was officially released on Google Play in September 2021 and the App Store in October 2021. Critics dubbed the wallet to be a copy of the Trust Wallet owned by Binance. Thomas Smith, who was the CTO for Safemoon, left the company in December 2021 for a role as a blockchain advisor for StrikeX, however, was dismissed by the company after the fraud allegations uncovered by Stephen Findeisen.

=== 2022: Migration to SafeMoon V2 ===
In December 2021, SafeMoon developed Version 2 of their token (SafeMoon V2), an updated version of the SafeMoon contract. As part of consolidating to V2, the SafeMoon team implemented a deadline to migrate their tokens, or else investors would be faced with a 100% tax. The team also released a decentralised exchange titled "Safemoon Swap" as the only place where this migration could happen. In April 2022, Safemoon announced a new product, the Safemoon card. The Safemoon card was promoted as a debit card that can be used to pay for goods using SafeMoon (and other cryptocurrencies) for a 2.5% fee. Some experts criticized paying an additional fee to pay for goods, contrasting it to Crypto.com's card which instead rewards users with a percentage return in crypto depending on how much of their native token they are holding. Although the card was supposed to be released in July 2022, as of December 2022 its release has been delayed.

Since the appointment of Karony in 2021, SafeMoon has announced plans to launch its own cryptocurrency exchange by October 2021, however, this was pushed to December 2022 and has again been pushed back to the end of 2023. The company also has plans to launch a blockchain, hardware wallet, and to become a macro Internet of things infrastructure on its own blockchain.

=== 2023: Liquidity pool hack and fraud indictment ===
On 29 March 2023, hackers exploited a security flaw in the smart contract of SafeMoon's liquidity pool which saw US$9 million worth of SFM tokens depleted from SafeMoon's liquidity pool causing a drop in the token's price. After negotiations with the SafeMoon team, the hacker agreed to return only 80% ($7 million) of the stolen liquidity and kept $2 million of the stolen tokens.

On 1 November 2023, a federal indictment was unsealed, charging SafeMoon's CEO Braden John Karony, Token Founder Kyle Nagy, and former SafeMoon employee Thomas Smith with conspiracies involving securities fraud, wire fraud, and money laundering in connection with SafeMoon. The United States District Court for the Eastern District of New York alleged that the defendants misled SafeMoon investors about the accessibility of 'locked' liquidity and engaged in personal trading. The charges reported that as SafeMoon's market capitalization exceeded $8 billion, they fraudulently diverted millions of dollars from the 'locked' liquidity for personal gain. Karony and Smith were arrested, while Nagy remained at large. The charges were brought by the SEC and the Department of Justice with FBI assistance.

=== 2024-present: Bakruptcy and Legacy ===
In December 2023, SafeMoon declared Chapter 7 bankruptcy, which was approved in March 2024. As a result, the court ordered Safemoon to liquidate remaining crypto assets and liquidity pools, formally killing the project's ecosystem and leaving the token virtually untradable. and as a part of this process was acquired by the VGX Foundation.

In 2024, Kyle Nagy resurfaced in Russia, where he filed a complaint with police against two men in the Federal Security Service who extorted 4.5 million dollars from him as "payment for his peaceful stay in the Russian Federation."

Following a highly publicized 12-day trial in May 2025 at a Brooklyn federal courthouse, former CEO Braden John Karony was convicted on all counts of conspiracy to commit securities fraud, wire fraud, and money laundering. Evidence proved he misled investors by siphoning millions from "locked" liquidity pools to buy luxury real estate and sports cars.

Former Chief Technology Officer Thomas Smith officially pleaded guilty to conspiracy charges and cooperated with the federal investigation in October 2025. The FBI launched a large-scale appeal urging affected SafeMoon investors to submit evidence of their losses to help calculate massive criminal restitution orders.

SafeMoon's legacy in the broader cryptocurrency ecosystem has been historically significant, many "copycat" tokens continue to appear utilising SafeMoon's name and tokenomics model.

== Criticisms and legal issues ==
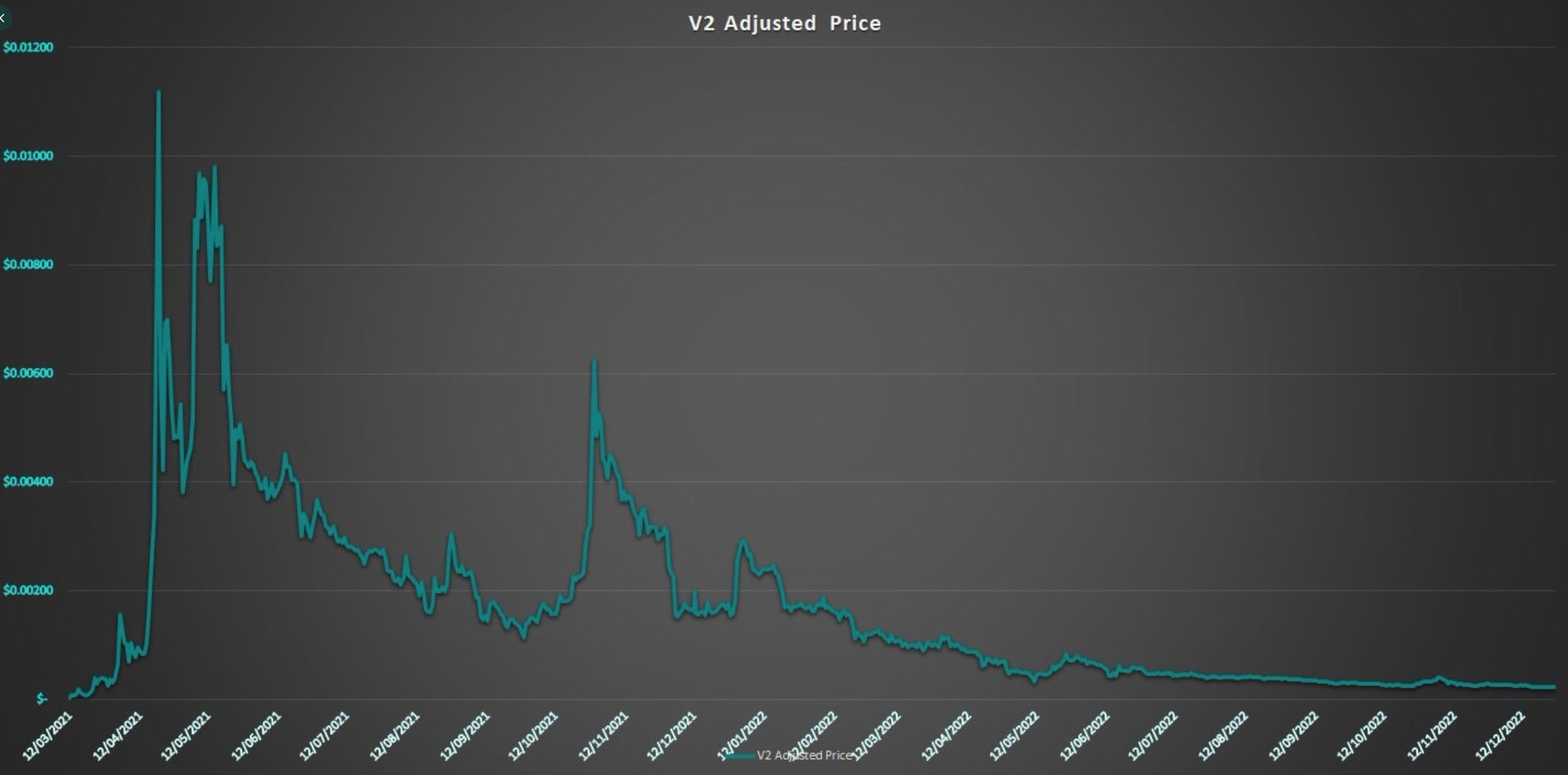
F1: Safemoon price adjusted to V2 from launch to December 2022. The token has dropped 98.7% in value from its all-time high in April 2021.

=== Parallels to a meme coin ===
The token was described pejoratively in May 2021 as a "meme coin" alongside Dogecoin and Shiba Inu, with much of its value attributed to the result of the 2021 crypto market frenzy.

The developers of SafeMoon were described as having "little proof of previous success", with the token described by one financial expert as "the furthest thing from safe" and that it "doesn't do anything".

=== Security issues ===
In May 2021, the V1 version of the token was audited by security auditing firm CertiK, which identified a "major issue" that the project's owners have "control over tokens funded by SafeMoon's seller fee". An owner address acquires the liquidity pool tokens generated by the SafeMoon-BNB pool. This gives the owner control over tokens funded by SafeMoon's seller fee. This feature was later the subject of the 2022 Safemoon fraud allegations. London Capital's head of research Jasper Lawler also noted that the Manual Burn aspect of SafeMoon paired with the controlling companies' large stake in the coins opens the project up to manipulation by the project controllers.

=== Ponzi-scheme comparisons ===
After the price of a SafeMoon token multiplied by 12x during a single week in April 2021, opinion columnists in various financial magazines likened SafeMoon to a ponzi scheme or pyramid scheme, where gains to early investors were paid only by incoming investors who expected a similar rate of return, with some citing the fact that each transaction sends a portion of the transacted value to existing holders of the token, as well as a portion of the transacted value to a wallet controlled by the coin's authors. Furthermore, SafeMoon's token economics utilizes a 10% sell tax. This means that for every $1000 sale, an investor would be charged $100. Critics argued that this discouraged investors from selling, as they effectively incur a loss as soon as they invest. The tax from the new investors included distributing a small percentage of it to existing investors.

=== 2022 fraud allegations ===
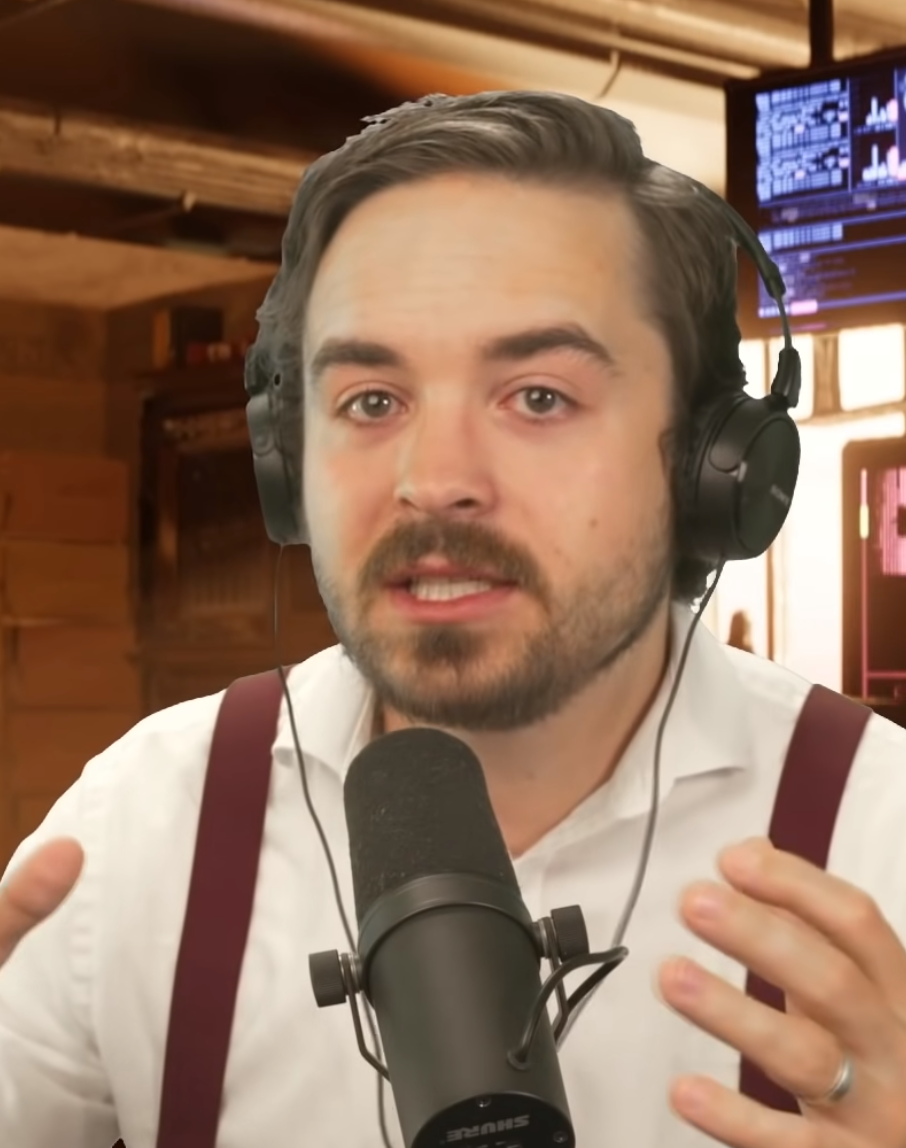
Coffeezilla is considered to be one of the main investigators into SafeMoon's fraud allegation.

In April 2022, Stephen "Coffeezilla" Findeisen, a prominent independent researcher who investigates crypto scams, accused the SafeMoon team of misappropriating millions of dollars. According to Findeisen, SafeMoon CEO Karony had been removing funds from the liquidity pool which is the primary explanation of the crypto's price pattern (Figure 1). Findeisen found evidence of transactions which showed SafeMoon's liquidity wallet moving funds to a wallet dubbed the "Gabe (6abe) wallet" which withdrew funds to a separate company run by John Karony. Former SafeMoon CTO, Thomas "Papa" Smith, was the only person who responded to Findeisen's claims stating that funds were taken from the "locked liquidity pool" before Karony's appointment. He sent Smith evidence of this in the form of a blockchain transaction showing an outflow of 36.7 trillion tokens from the liquidity pool, dated 5 March 2021.

=== Class-action lawsuits ===
On 18 February 2022, in a class-action lawsuit filed against SafeMoon it was alleged that the company was a pump and dump scheme. Logan Paul was named as a defendant along with musician Nick Carter, rappers Soulja Boy and Lil Yachty, and social media personality Ben Phillips for promoting the SafeMoon token on their social media accounts with misleading information. On the same day, the U.S. 11th Circuit Court of Appeals ruled in a lawsuit against Bitconnect that the Securities Act of 1933 extends to targeted solicitation using social media. Findeisen, who had just shone a light on the 2022 SafeMoon fraud allegations, supported the claims that Paul and Phillips were pumping and dumping SafeMoon tokens during this time which saw a decline of 96% in token price. On 22 August 2022, it was documented that Dave Portnoy, who was also a defendant in this case, was dismissed from the lawsuit after it was revealed that he never received any compensation from Safemoon for promoting the token and that he also lost his investment from buying SFM.

In May 2022, multiple SafeMoon investors filed another class action lawsuit against SafeMoon for security fraud. The lawsuit which is represented by Scott+Scott, was voluntarily terminated by the plaintiff without prejudice per notice in November 2022. This means the case can be retried if the plaintiff wishes to in the future.

=== Project Pheonix lawsuit ===
As part of Project Pheonix, a separate company Emanations Communications Group LC (ECG) was set up and led by SafeMoon CEO John Karony's mother, Jennifer, to provide antenna technology to The Gambia. The company has since been seized by Lex Vest Ltd. As part of this venture, John invested $5 million into the project in June 2021. It was claimed that Karony funded this investment from SafeMoon's liquidity pool which was supposedly locked up. As part of this capital investment John agreed 33.34% stake in the company and future profits, as well as his own personal bills, to come out of the company. ECG determined that John Karony created too many regulatory risks and that due to multiple lawsuits filed against him and his company (SafeMoon), they were uncomfortable accepting any more capital investments from him. As a result, John Karony filed a lawsuit against ECG for breach of contract and accused his mother of legal trickery to remove him from ECG.

ECG developed technology relating to Project Pheonix which was presented to John in December 2021. According to court documents, John had been disclosing information about developing technology for the benefit of SafeMoon to make claims on SafeMoon's website and social media accounts about the technology. He was counselled not to do so by ECG (particularly his mother) because of potential adverse effects on pending patents and other intellectual property. In March 2022, John and his counsel met with Project Pheonix partners Sankung Jawara and Pa Alieu Jawara, and offered them an upfront payment of $350,000 to cut Jennifer Karony out of the transaction, which they refused. John then negotiated an offer to pay them of up to $4.5 million, to be paid out over time, with the understanding that Jennifer was again removed from consideration. Sankung and Pa Alieu once more refused, due to the proposed circumvention of the business partnership and John's assertion that there was a way to circumvent the legal and parliamentary procedures required for John's desired bank project.

Karony's mother stated that John had not provided a plan for Project Pheonix and was not interested in the content of the financial documents, but was looking for "opportunities to take pictures of the lab to substantiate his published claims of owning ECG labs which he called 'Area 32' or 'DarkMoon'". Due to the lawsuit, Project Pheonix was abandoned. On 27 August 2022, John stated that his reasons for discontinuing his work in West Africa were due to supply chain problems, which is disputed by his mother.

=== Liquidity pool hack ===
On 29 March 2023, it was reported that almost US$9 million worth of SafeMoon tokens were depleted from SafeMoon's liquidity pool after hackers exploited a security flaw in its smart contracts. As a result, the price of the token fell further in value. The hacker agreed to return only 80% ($7 million) of the stolen liquidity after striking a deal with the team to keep $2 million of the stolen tokens.

=== Fraud indictment ===
On 1 November 2023, a federal indictment was unsealed charging Braden John Karony, Kyle Nagy, and Thomas Smith with conspiracies to commit securities fraud, wire fraud, and money laundering through SafeMoon. According to the US District Court for the Eastern District of New York, "As alleged, the defendants lied to SFM investors concerning whether SFM's use of 'locked' liquidity was inaccessible to the defendants, as well as their personal holding and trading of SFM. As SFM's market capitalization grew to more than $8 billion, the defendants fraudulently diverted and misappropriated millions of dollars' worth of purportedly 'locked' SFM liquidity for their personal benefit." At the time Karony and Smith had been arrested while Nagy remained at large. The charges were brought in parallel by the SEC and the Department of Justice with assistance from the FBI.

On 21 May 2025, following a 12-day trial before the federal courthouse in Brooklyn, Karony was convicted of all three charges brought against him.

On 10 February 2026, Karony was sentenced to a 100-month prison term and ordered to forfeit $7.5 million, as well as two residential properties.

As of April 2026, Kyle Nagy remains at large. He is believed to have fled to Russia in 2024, where he remains as of 2026.

== See also ==
- Decentralized finance
- Meme coin
- Binance Smart Chain
