= $Trump =

Cryptocurrency launched by Donald Trump

Denominations
- Code: TRUMP
- Precision: 6

Development
- Initial release: January 17, 2025; 22 months ago
- Development status: Active
- Operating system: Cross-platform (Solana blockchain)
- Developer(s): CIC Digital LLC, Fight Fight Fight LLC

Ledger
- Block explorer: https://solscan.io/token/6p6xgHyF7AeE6TZkSmFsko444wqoP15icUSqi2jfGiPN
- Circulating supply: 200 million
- Supply limit: 1 billion

Valuation
- Exchange rate: Floating

Website
- Website: gettrumpmemes.com

After a brief initial rise, the market price of the $Trump meme coin declined. A Chainalysis study concluded that through the middle of 2025, 58 investors had made profits exceeding $10 million each—mostly early traders who got out before the price decline. Through June 2026, 988,905 wallets lost a total of $3.81 billion while Trump profited $636 million.

$Trump (stylized in all caps) is a meme coin cryptocurrency associated with United States president Donald Trump, hosted on the Solana blockchain. One billion coins were created; 800 million remain owned by two Trump-owned companies, after 200 million were publicly released in an initial coin offering (ICO) on January 17, 2025. Less than a day later, the aggregate market value of all coins was more than $27 billion, valuing Trump's holdings at more than $20 billion. A March 2025 Financial Times analysis found that the crypto project netted at least $350 million through sales of tokens and fees.

The venture has faced widespread condemnation from ethics experts for Donald Trump's conflicts of interest related to the project and his presidential duties. During the second Trump administration, Trump has promoted $Trump and taken actions that have raised the value of the meme coin, contributing to a substantial increase in his net worth.

== History ==
Avatar of Donald J. Trump

Donald J. Trump
(@realDonaldTrump)
tweeted:

My NEW Official Trump Meme is HERE! It's time to celebrate everything we stand for: WINNING! Join my very special Trump Community. GET YOUR $TRUMP NOW. Go to gettrumpmemes.com/ — Have Fun!

January 17, 2025

The Trump meme coin was launched on January 17, 2025, three days before Trump was inaugurated as president of the United States. The lack of a public announcement initially led to concerns that the cryptocurrency was a scam and might have no association to the president-elect. Several hours later, Trump announced $Trump on his X and Truth social accounts. The meme coin website described it as the "only official Trump meme". Its logo is a digitally-stylized image of Trump raising his fist after surviving the attempted assassination in July 2024. A disclaimer said that the coin was "not intended to be, or the subject of" an investment opportunity or a security and was "not political and has nothing to do with" any political campaign, political office or government agency. The terms of the offering prohibit coin buyers from joining any class-action lawsuits against the project and assert indemnity against any claims. Trump promoted the coin on the night of its ICO while a "Crypto Ball" was underway.

The New York Times reported in January 2025 that Trump affiliates controlled an additional 800 million tokens that, hypothetically, could be worth over $56 billion at the current market value, potentially making Trump one of the richest people in the world at an estimated net worth of $63.8 billion.

In March 2025, a Financial Times analysis found that the crypto project netted at least $350 million ($314 million from the sale of the tokens and $36 million from fees). However, by July 2025, New York reported that the president's holdings in the coin were only worth about $93 million. This was contradicted by reporting in The New Yorker in August 2025 suggesting that holdings held by Trump through a partnership "are potentially worth several billion dollars" and that actualized profits from the meme coin were $385 million.

=== 2025 private dinner ===
In April 2025, the top 220 holders of the coin were offered dinner with the president, and the very top 25 holders would receive a special VIP White House tour. Following the announcement, the coin jumped more than 50%. Analysis found that leaked information about the promotion allowed certain traders to make bets on the coin before it was publicly announced. According to The New York Times, certain buyers in interviews and statements said they "bought the coins or entered the dinner contest with the intention of securing an action by Mr. Trump to affect United States policy". On May 13, The New York Times reported that GD Culture Group, a small company with ties to China, no reported revenue in 2024, and an affiliation with TikTok, announced it would spend $300 million on purchasing Bitcoin and $Trump using proceeds from "a stock sale to an unnamed entity in the British Virgin Islands". The purchase was the first known instance of a China-linked firm buying Trump's cryptocurrency. TikTok is facing a ban in the US, although Trump has postponed the decision several times.

According to The New York Times, at least twenty investors sold or transferred their holdings in $Trump on May 12. The bidding process allowed certain investors to profit; in one instance, an investor, known only as "Noah", purchased US$2.2 million in $Trump before the contest and sold it at the end of the contest, profiting over US$950,000. In an apparent effort to stop the sell-off, the social media account associated with $Trump promised to give investors who kept their coins a non-fungible token known as "Trump Diamond Hand" and that they would earn reward points. Several investors were able to attend the dinner for only the cost of trading fees by shorting $Trump. According to NBC News, the winners of the contest collectively spent US$394 million. References to a tour of the White House were later removed from the dinner's website; a senior Trump official stated that the administration was not conducting a tour for the investors.

The "black-tie optional" dinner was held at Trump National Golf Club Washington, D.C. in Sterling, Virginia. Before the dinner, protesters had gathered to condemn the gathering, shouting, "Shame!" The menu featured filet mignon, pan-seared halibut, and a "Trump organic field green salad". An attendee who spoke to The Verge described "pretty light" security, Trump's limited presence and his speech—delivered behind a podium with the presidential seal—and a private afterparty at the Washington Marriott Capitol Hill hosted by Memecore. Trump's speech was approximately fifteen to twenty minutes long. Four of the highest-paying investors, including Justin Sun, were given US$100,000 Tourbillon watches. The dinner was Sun's first visit to the United States since being investigated by the United States attorney for the Southern District of New York in 2021.

MemeCore, a cryptocurrency company, invested US$19.3 million to become the second-largest holder; Cherry Hsu, the company's chief business officer, stated that he was interested in sharing its "vision and mission" with Trump and other attendees. The largest holder was an account belonging to HTX that was believed to be associated with Justin Sun. Javier Selgas, the chief executive of Fr8Tech, told the Securities and Exchange Commission that he intended to purchase US$20 million in $Trump in an effort to convince Trump to lower tariffs on Mexico. Through a guest list and social media, the Times later identified many of the attendees, including Sun and the former basketball player Lamar Odom.

The dinner posed ethics concerns and opportunities for foreign influence. Wyoming senator Cynthia Lummis and North Carolina senator Thom Tillis expressed concerns over the dinner. Citizens for Responsibility and Ethics in Washington's Donald Sherman described it as "one of the most blatant and appalling instances of selling access to the presidency". Massachusetts senator Elizabeth Warren described the dinner as an "orgy of corruption", while Oregon senator Jeff Merkley referred to it as "the Mount Everest of American corruption."

Merkley and Senate minority leader Chuck Schumer introduced a bill to ban senior executive branch officials—including Trump—and their family from profiting off of cryptocurrency. Merkley additionally asked the Office of Government Ethics to investigate the dinner. The Senate Homeland Security Permanent Subcommittee on Investigations's investigation into cryptocurrency businesses involving Trump broadened to include the dinner. Maryland representative Jamie Raskin, the ranking member of the House Committee on the Judiciary, later initiated an inquiry into the dinner. The late-night television hosts Jimmy Fallon and Jimmy Kimmel ridiculed the dinner for its attendees and its apparent corruption, respectively.

=== 2026 private events ===
In April 2026, the top buyers of the $Trump coin attended a Mar-a-Lago event where they got potential facetime with Trump. The Citizens for Responsibility and Ethics in Washington (CREW) condemned the event and the $Trump coin as unethical.

Though the May 2025 event required at least $55,000 worth of coin holdings to receive an invitation, a similar event in November 2026 allowed buyers to receive an invitation for $518. The value of the coin had dropped beneath $1 per coin after having exceeded $75 soon after its January 2025 issuance.

== Token distribution ==
According to the meme coin's website, ownership of the token is primarily concentrated in two Trump owned entities: CIC Digital LLC and Fight Fight Fight LLC, which together hold 80 percent of the coins remaining after the ICO. Trump's personal profit under this ownership structure is unclear. The holdings are scheduled for gradual release over three years.

== Value ==
After its launch in January 2025, the price of the meme coin soared by over 300% overnight. Within two days, it became the 19th most valuable form of cryptocurrency in the world, with a total trading value of nearly $13 billion, and a total of $29 billion worth of trades based on a $64 value of each of the 200 million tokens issued by the afternoon of January 19.

In February 2025, a forensic analysis commissioned by The New York Times concluded that 813,294 wallets lost $2 billion by trading the coin while the president's company and partners profited about $100 million from trading fees. According to Fortune, "Less than three weeks after its release, President Donald Trump's meme coin has produced more losers than winners. For every dollar in trading fees the Trump crypto creators raked in, investors lost $20."

By early July 2026, the coin was trading at less than $US2; it was down 97 percent from its peak price of $75.35. Two out of three buyers had lost money, either when selling the coin, or based on its early July market price, if still holding the coin. About 990,000 buyers had lost a total of $3.81 billion.

The value of the coin dropped beneath $1 per coin after Republican losses in the November 2026 midterm elections.

== Reception ==
Some crypto executives and investors said Trump had undermined the credibility of the industry they had worked hard to build by selling coins known for their speculative nature and extreme volatility. They also noted Trump's brazen conflict of interest by setting crypto market policies while directly benefiting from participating in the market. Some noted its similarity to a "rug pull", in which a coin is launched and quickly abandoned, leaving early investors with steep losses. The Wall Street Journal reported "Even the most ardent Trump supporters reached a breaking point when the $MELANIA token launched less than 48 hours after" $Trump, with one urging Trump to fire the advisor who recommended it. Erik Voorhees, a prominent Bitcoin investor, criticized the coin as "stupid and embarrassing".

Others discussed its lack of any utility beyond enriching Trump.

$TRUMP doesn't purport to hold value in the way that bitcoin or stablecoins do. Nor does $TRUMP entitle a buyer to a vote on a company's future direction, as World Liberty's initial token does. It does not even convey the right to own a digital cartoon of Trump. It's a meme coin, a novelty, a bit of fun—the fun, for those who enjoy it, of paying Donald Trump.

— David D. Kirkpatrick in The New Yorker

Ethics experts criticized the crypto venture and government watchdogs. The venture and the possibility of foreign governments buying the coin and enriching Trump was highlighted as possibly violating the Constitution's foreign emoluments clause. Critics said it could allow special interests and foreign governments to seek to buy influence with the president.

The release of $Trump was condemned by ethics lawyers, including Adav Noti, the director of the Campaign Legal Center, and Jordan Libowitz, the vice president for communications at Citizens for Responsibility and Ethics in Washington. Nick Tomaino, a former executive at Coinbase, described Trump's ownership and the timing of the cryptocurrency as "predatory". Anthony Scaramucci, a former White House Communications Director during the first Trump administration and current crypto investor, described the coin as "Idi Amin level corruption" and said that the launch of the coin was bad for the cryptocurrency industry. He added, "Now anyone in world can essentially deposit money into bank account of President of USA with a couple clicks." Brendan Fischer, the deputy executive director at Documented, an investigative news outlet, said, "The timing of this launch cannot be a coincidence. It comes just after Trump's campaign ended, and just before he formally takes office and is fully subject to federal ethics rules." With the coin having slumped in value as of the end of early February 2025, the circumstances around the coin have led to wide condemnation from ethics experts and concerns over conflicts of interest as well as allegations from members of Congress that have called for an investigation.

Some analysts described it as a pump and dump scheme, and a "disaster". A forensic analysis commissioned by The New York Times concluded that 813,294 wallets lost $2 billion by trading the coin while the president's company and partners profited about $100 million from trading fees. According to Fortune, "Less than three weeks after its release, President Donald Trump's meme coin has produced more losers than winners. For every dollar in trading fees the Trump crypto creators raked in, investors lost $20."

Representative Sam Liccardo, a Democrat who represents Silicon Valley, introduced the Modern Emoluments and Malfeasance Enforcement Act (MEME Act), which would prohibit the issuance or endorsement of any financial asset by the president, senior White House officials, or members of Congress, or their spouses or children. Unlike the Hatch Act, it would introduce a private right of action for anyone harmed by purchasing such assets.

== $Melania ==
The Melania meme coin experienced extreme volatility in its first days, after which it declined in price.

After the launch of the $Trump meme coin, Trump's wife Melania launched her own meme coin, $Melania on January 19, 2025. The launch of the $Melania token was partially handled by Hayden Davis, who later played a key role in orchestrating the $Libra cryptocurrency scandal. Davis admitted to his involvement in "sniping" the $Melania and $Libra tokens, a legally-questionable practice similar to front running.

In October 2025, founders of decentralized crypto exchange Meteora were named in a class action lawsuit alleging that Melania Trump's meme coin, among fifteen tokens, was part of a scheme utilizing "weaponized fame to disarm diligence". From President Trump's 2024 inauguration day to the end of November 2025, the price of the $Melania token fell 99%, while the price of the $Trump token fell 86%.

== House Judiciary Committee report ==
On November 25, 2025, U.S. Representative Jamie Raskin released a report finding that following an investigation by Democrats on the U.S. House Judiciary Committee, it was determined that the cryptocurrency policies of Trump were in fact used to benefit Trump and his family, with Trump in fact adding billions of dollars to his net worth through cryptocurrency schemes which were entangled with foreign governments, corporate allies, and criminal actors. The report, titled Trump, Crypto, and a New Age of Corruption, also found that Trump dismantled anti-corruption and financial integrity safeguards and pardoned people who were regarded as "corporate cronies" in order build his cryptocurrency empire. In November 2026, The New York Times reported that career CFTC officials had considered an investigation into the Trump memecoin for possible fraud, but dropped the matter after concluding that then-agency chair Caroline Pham would not have approved the necessary subpoenas.

== See also ==
- Donald Trump's stance on cryptocurrencies
- Trump Rebate Banking system, fraudulent products that use Trump's name and likeness
- World Liberty Financial, a decentralized finance project linked with the family of Donald Trump
- Rug pull

== Works cited ==
- Anderson, Zac; Garrison, Joey (May 22, 2025). "Trump's crypto dinner: Black ties, a Chinese billionaire and ethics questions". USA Today.
- Berwick, Angus; Kowsmann, Patricia; Ge Huang, Vicky (May 22, 2025). "A Crypto Billionaire Who Feared Arrest in the U.S. Returns for Dinner With Trump". The Wall Street Journal.
- Collier, Kevin (May 21, 2025). "Trump's crypto dinner cost over $1 million per seat on average". NBC News.
- Harty, Declan (May 22, 2025). "Meet the crypto investors who bought a dinner with Trump". POLITICO.
- Fahrenthold, David; Lipton, Eric; Shao, Elena; Freedman, Dylan (May 23, 2025). "Who Won a Seat at Trump's Crypto Dinner?". The New York Times.
- Ge Huang, Vicky (January 19, 2025). "Trump Launches Meme Coins Ahead of White House Return". The Wall Street Journal.
- Ingram, David; Egwuonwu, Nnamdi (May 22, 2025). "At Trump's crypto dinner: Tuxedos, luxury cars and a former NBA star". NBC News.
- Jansen, Bart (May 23, 2025). "Trump speaks with presidential seal at crypto dinner the White House billed as private". USA Today.
- Kharif, Olga (May 14, 2025). "Trump Memecoin Speculator Says Presidential Dinner Is Costing Him Just $1,200". Bloomberg News.
- Kharif, Olga (May 21, 2025). "Behind Trump's 'Most Exclusive' Dinner, a Partner Sells Access". Bloomberg News.
- Kharif, Olga; Faux, Zeke (May 22, 2025). "Protesters Yell 'Shame' at Guests of Trump's Memecoin Dinner". Bloomberg News.
- Lipton, Eric; Freedman, Dylan; Yaffe-Bellany, David (May 12, 2025). "Some Bidders in Trump's Contest Sold All Their Digital Coins but Still Won". The New York Times.
- Neuman, Scott (May 22, 2025). "Politics:Raising ethics questions, top Trump meme coin investors to dine with president tonight". Morning Edition. NPR.CITEREFNeuman2025
- Nguyen, Tina (May 23, 2025). "Presidential seals, 'light vetting,' $100,000 gem-encrusted watches, and a Marriott afterparty". The Verge.
- Shapero, Julia (May 25, 2025). "Democrats rip Trump ahead of meme coin dinner: 'Orgy of corruption'". The Hill.
- Treene, Alayna (May 23, 2025). "Inside the room at Trump's meme coin dinner". CNN.
- Vineyard, Jennifer (May 23, 2025). "Jimmy Kimmel Digests Trump's Crypto Dinner". The New York Times.
- Yaffe-Bellany, David; Goldstein, Matthew; Lipton, Eric (April 23, 2025). "Trump Offers Private Dinner to Top 220 Investors in His Memecoin". The New York Times.
- Yaffe-Bellany, David; Lipton, Eric (May 13, 2025). "Tiny Company With China Ties Announces Big Purchase of Trump Cryptocurrency". The New York Times.
- Yaffe-Bellany, David; Lipton, Eric (May 22, 2025). "Hundreds Join Trump at 'Exclusive' Dinner, With Dreams of Crypto Fortunes in Mind". The New York Times.
- Zakrzewski, Cat (May 29, 2025). "House Democrat launches investigation of Trump's meme coin dinner". The Washington Post.
