= Damián Arabia =

Argentine politician (born 1991)

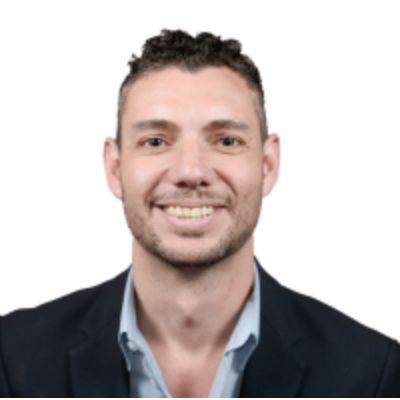

National Deputy
- Incumbent
- Assumed office 10 December 2023
- Constituency: City of Buenos Aires

Personal details
- Born: 22 July 1991 (age 35) Buenos Aires, Argentina
- Party: Republican Proposal
- Other political affiliations: Juntos por el Cambio
- Education: Universidad de Palermo

Damián Arabia (born 22 July 1991) is an Argentine politician who has been a National Deputy elected in Buenos Aires since 2023. He belongs to Republican Proposal (PRO).

== Early life ==
Arabia was born on 22 July 1991 in Buenos Aires. He counts with a licenciate degree on Social Sciences from Universidad de Palermo and a diplomate degree on Public Administration and Governance.

== Political career ==
He began his political activism as a member of Republican Proposal (PRO). From 2015 to 2019 he was Director of Integrity Control for Federal Forces at the Ministry of Security under the administration of Patricia Bullrich. He is widely considered to be a protegé of Bullrich and is closely aligned with her.

In the 2023 legislative election he ran for a seat in the Argentine Chamber of Deputies as part of the Juntos por el Cambio list in Buenos Aires. The list received 42.61% of the votes, enough for Arabia to make it past the D'Hondt cut, having run as the 5th candidate in the list. His mandate began on 10 December 2023.

== Personal life ==
Arabia is openly gay.

== Electoral history ==
Electoral history of Damián Arabia
Election	Office	List	#	District	Votes			Result	Ref.
Election	Office	List	#	District	Total	%	P.	Result	Ref.
2023	National Deputy	Juntos por el Cambio	5	City of Buenos Aires	782,984	42.61%	1st (Note: Presented on an electoral list. The data shown represents the share of the vote the entire party/alliance received in that constituency.)	Elected	
