= Trump Rebate Banking system =

Scam targeting fans of Donald Trump

The Trump Rebate Banking system (TRB) is a scam targeting fans of Donald Trump. TRB system vendors sell membership materials and collectible items, like "Trump coin" medallions (unrelated to the $Trump cryptocurrency token), "Trump Bucks" banknotes, and metal checks, that they suggest will become legal tender under a future monetary system.

== History ==
Physical "Trump coins" have been sold since 2016. Among Trump fan groups on Telegram, Trump coins and Trump-branded cryptocurrency have been promoted by affiliate marketers. ClickBank, an affiliate marketing network, said that Trump coins were their most popular product in October 2021, and the second-most popular the following month. Popularity soared after the January 6 United States Capitol attack. To promote the coins, marketers falsely claimed that Nancy Pelosi intended to ban them. Many posts compared Trump coins to bitcoin, claiming that their price was going to increase. Some promotion, such as on TikTok, used synthesized audio of Trump endorsing the products.

In 2023, NBC News identified three Colorado-based companies, Patriots Dynasty, Patriots Future, and USA Patriots, as being behind the marketing operation for "Trump Bucks" and TRB membership cards, collectibles marketed as being redeemable for a cash value in the future. For example, a "$10,000 Diamond Trump Bucks" banknote, sold for $99.99, was claimed to be redeemable by membership cardholders at banks and major retail stores. Orders were fulfilled from ShipOffers, a fulfillment and distribution operation for many companies, from a warehouse in Aurora, Colorado. NBC News spoke to several banks and retail companies, none of which indicated that they would accept these collectibles. Following the investigation, ClickBank said that it had disabled web sites that were selling Trump Bucks.

In February 2024, a Radio Free Europe/Radio Liberty investigation traced a lucrative Trump-themed memorabilia fraud to Veles, North Macedonia, where people promoted items via Telegram channels. A similar scam, promising that a "Trump Liberty Coin" purchased for $149 could be redeemed at Bank of America for $100,000, circulated in April 2024; a Bank of America spokesperson denied any connection between the bank and the coins.
