= Nicholas Megalis =

American singer-songwriter

Nicholas Benjamin Megalis
- Born: April 8, 1989 (age 35)
- Origin: Pittsburgh, Pennsylvania
- Genres: Rock; hip hop
- Occupations: Musician; songwriter
- Instruments: Guitar; piano; vocals; production
- Years active: 2005–present
- Website: www.nicholasmegalis.com

Nicholas Benjamin Megalis (born April 8, 1989) is an American visual artist, singer-songwriter, director, and social media personality. He is best known for his videos on Vine.

== History ==
Megalis was born in Pittsburgh, Pennsylvania and moved to Cleveland, Ohio at age 13. In Cleveland he found relatively quick success performing solo and with various bands at local venues, all under his name. At age 16, he met a producer in Cleveland and recorded a studio album titled "I See The Moon". Up until that point, Megalis had mostly recorded in his bedroom, playing guitar to a drum machine. He moved to Brooklyn, New York in 2009. Starting in March 2013, he began to publish content on the social networking video sharing service Vine, on which as of May 2014 he had 4.9 million followers. As of January 2019 Megalis was finishing a studio EP titled “Not Funny” with producer Frankie Siragusa. Megalis is producing fine art and lives in the Palm Springs area of Southern California. He has one child named Lady Ophelia.

== Discography ==
- Hands To The Sky, We All Wave Goodbye To Our Mothers
- I See The Moon
- Whatever I Am, You'll Understand
- Praise Be, Hype Machine
- I Find It Sexy How You Mislead Me
- Side A
- Gummy Money
- Forget It in a day
- Not Funny
