= Coffeezilla =

American YouTuber

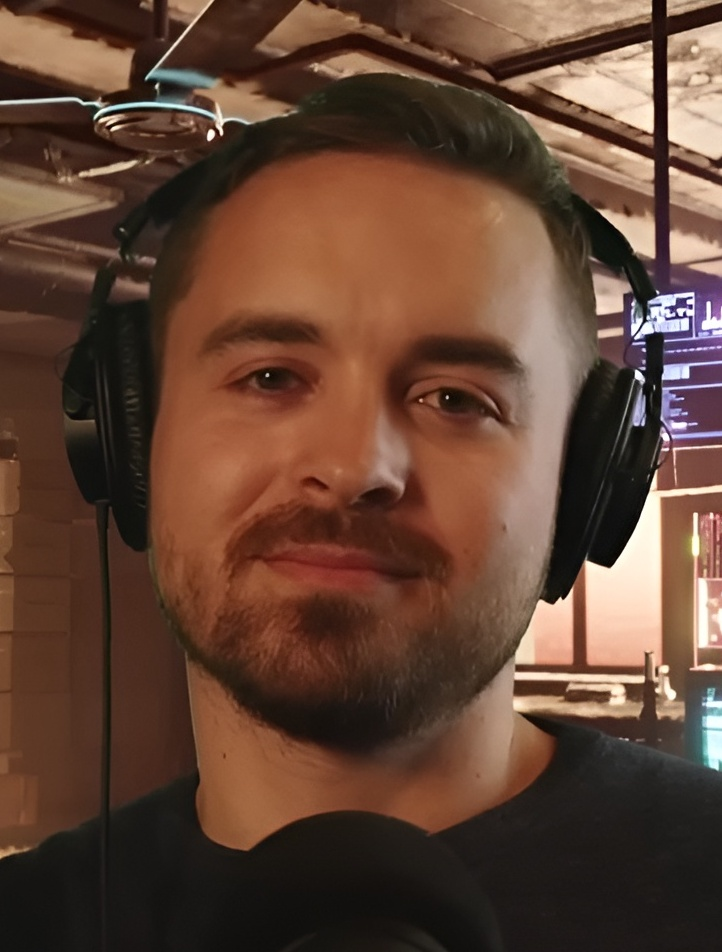
- Findeisen in December 2022
- Born: Stephen Findeisen; 1993 or 1994 (age 32–33); Texas, U.S.
- Other names: Coffee, Coffee Break, voidzilla
- Education: Texas A&M University

YouTube information
- Channel: Coffeezilla
- Years active: 2018–present
- Genres: Commentary; finance
- Subscribers: 4.69 million
- Views: 591 million
- Last updated: July 6, 2026

Stephen Findeisen (born 1993 or 1994), better known as Coffeezilla, is an American YouTuber and cryptocurrency journalist who is known primarily for his channel on which he investigates and discusses scams, usually surrounding cryptocurrency, internet fraud, decentralized finance and internet celebrities. Before Coffeezilla, Findeisen was active on YouTube with the channel "Coffee Break" between 2017 and 2020, before becoming more active on his second channel, "coffeezilla".

== Education ==
Findeisen holds a degree in chemical engineering from Texas A&M University.

== Career ==
Before his YouTube career, Findeisen sold houses for a local builder. He was motivated to hunt down scams after his mother was persuaded to buy questionable products with the belief that they would help treat her recently diagnosed cancer. His mother would later end up recovering after surgery. He began his career as a YouTuber by uploading videos in which he makes allegations about influencers and financial commentators.

In October 2024, Coffeezilla sent a series of questions to Andrew Tate about Tate’s meme coin DADDY. In response, Tate doxxed Coffeezilla by leaking his email address and encouraged his supporters to email abusive content to Coffeezilla, specifically requesting they call him "gay."

=== Style ===
Findeisen films in front of a green screen, often wearing suspenders, with elaborate computer-generated backgrounds rendered in Blender by his Ukrainian collaborator 1O1OO11O1O. Animated graphics are used to illustrate connections between people, flows of money, etc., while vignettes in the world outside of the studio, including a recurring character of a robot bartender called Maxwell, are used for exposition and storytelling.

== Notable investigations ==
=== Save the Kids token ===
Coffeezilla gained international recognition after making a series of videos that investigated Save the Kids token, a cryptocurrency widely seen as a pump-and-dump scheme. He claimed that former FaZe Clan member Frazier Khattri (FaZe Kay) collaborated with YouTube prankster Sam Pepper. In response, Khattri's lawyers threatened to sue Findeisen in a cease and desist letter unless he retracted his statements, but Findeisen called the cease and desist letter "absolute toilet paper".

=== SafeMoon ===
In April 2022, Findeisen accused the SafeMoon team of misappropriating millions of dollars. According to Findeisen, Safemoon CEO John Karony had been removing funds from the liquidity pool, which is the primary explanation for the crypto's price pattern. Findeisen found evidence of transactions that showed SafeMoon's liquidity wallet moving funds to a wallet dubbed the "Gabe (6abe) wallet" which withdrew funds to a separate company run by Karony. Former SafeMoon CTO Thomas "Papa" Smith was the only person who responded to Findeisen's claims stating that funds were taken from the "locked liquidity pool" before Karony's appointment. He sent Smith evidence of this in the form of a blockchain transaction showing an outflow of 36.7 trillion tokens from the liquidity pool, dated March 5, 2021. Former SafeMoon CTO, Thomas Smith, who had a role as a blockchain advisor for StrikeX, was dismissed by the company after the fraud allegations uncovered by Findeisen. Coffeezilla has made multiple other reports on SafeMoon, including the pump-and-dump scheme against many influencers, including Soulja Boy, Logan Paul, Lil Yachty, Ben Phillips, among others, as well as highlighting the controversy surrounding the SafeMoon CEO suing his own mother.

=== FTX ===
Findeisen was additionally active during the bankruptcy of FTX, interviewing FTX founder Sam Bankman-Fried on three occasions and describing Bankman-Fried's responses during the last interview as an admission of fraud. In light of his involvement with investigating FTX in particular, The Washington Post credited Findeisen as one of the most powerful independent news sources when it comes to the cryptocurrency industry.

Bankman-Fried was arrested in the Bahamas on December 12, 2022, and convicted of wire fraud and conspiracy in the United States v. Bankman-Fried trial for crimes directly related to FTX. On March 28, 2024, Bankman-Fried was sentenced to 25 years in prison.

=== CryptoZoo ===
In December 2022, Findeisen published a three-part series on NFT-based game CryptoZoo, a project Logan Paul developed and founded. He criticized the project for not delivering on its promises and said that the team engaged in market manipulation. In a now-deleted video, Paul responded to the allegations, while also threatening legal action against Findeisen for defamation and claiming that Findeisen broke "criminal and civil laws" by uploading a recording of a phone call with his manager, Jeff Levin. He withdrew the threat in January 2023.

On June 27, 2024, Paul filed a lawsuit for defamation against Findeisen, along with his company, Coffee Break Productions, complaining that Findeisen had spread false information about Paul's connection with CryptoZoo. In August 2024, Findeisen responded in a video asserting that the lawsuit is a strategic move to block investigations into Liquid Marketplace, a company co-owned by Paul, which has been accused by Canadian authorities of "multi-layered fraud".

In July 2026, the litigation was settled out of court, and Paul filed to dismiss the lawsuit with prejudice on July 21, 2026.

=== MrBeast ===
In November 2024, Findeisen published a video investigating the cryptocurrency activity of Jimmy Donaldson (MrBeast). The investigation tracked his acquisition of various NFTs from different collections. He was investigated on allegations of insider trading from the sale of the crypto-coins Polychain Monsters and STACK using information provided by his business partner KSI.

The investigation was done in collaboration with blockchain experts, who tracked potential wallets belonging to Donaldson.

=== CSGO & CS2 gambling ===
Counter-Strike: Global Offensive (CS:GO) and, after 2023, Counter-Strike 2 (CS2) are multiplayer first-person shooter video games developed by Valve Corporation. While skin gambling is against Steam's terms of service, there have been cases of people promoting CS:GO skin gambling websites—such as in 2016, when YouTube creators "Tmartn" and "ProSyndicate" were criticized by fellow YouTuber "HonorTheCall" for their promotion of CSGOLotto without disclosing their ownership of the platform to their audience, which was subsequently reported on by other media outlets.

In December 2024, Findeisen published a three-part web series outlining an investigation into the CS2 gambling industry. He states that CSGOEmpire, an online casino, offered him a $20,000 bounty to expose a rival site, CSGORoll, and investigate HypeDrop, a Danish online casino owned by CSGORoll. The first video showcases a direct-action protest against CSGORoll, funded by CSGOEmpire at the PGL Major Copenhagen 2024, a CS2 esports tournament. Findeisen then states that Monarch, the owner of CSGOEmpire, hired people to harass influencers who promoted their rival. For example, notices were distributed in Halden, Norway, denouncing Sebastian Gjerlaugsen (who is from there) for promoting gambling.

His second video explores the CS:GO and CS2 gambling industry as a whole. Findeisen states that minors were easily able to access these casinos without requiring sufficient verification, and he then explored the roles of online influencers in promoting such websites. He then discusses HypeDrop, a website where one can purchase loot boxes. Findeisen stated that HypeDrop enacted a program, offering free daily crates to customers, to convince the Danish Gambling Authority that they were not a gambling site. Monarch also accused them of running a Ponzi scheme. The site was closed on April 26, 2024.

In his third video, Findeisen accuses Valve—and holds them responsible for—enabling such gambling schemes, especially for failing to proactively crack down on these sites without public pressure.

=== $LIBRA token scandal ===
On February 17, 2025, Findeisen conducted an interview with Hayden Davis, the CEO of the company behind the $Libra cryptocurrency scandal, in which Davis claimed to have profited US$113 million from the currency promoted by Argentina's president Javier Milei while also denying allegations of a rug pull scam, claiming that it was "a plan gone miserably wrong". Davis also confessed that the project's team sniped the token at its launch.

== Personal life ==
Findeisen has been married since 2017 and lives with his wife in Houston, Texas.
