= Sam Pepper =

English media personality (born 1989)

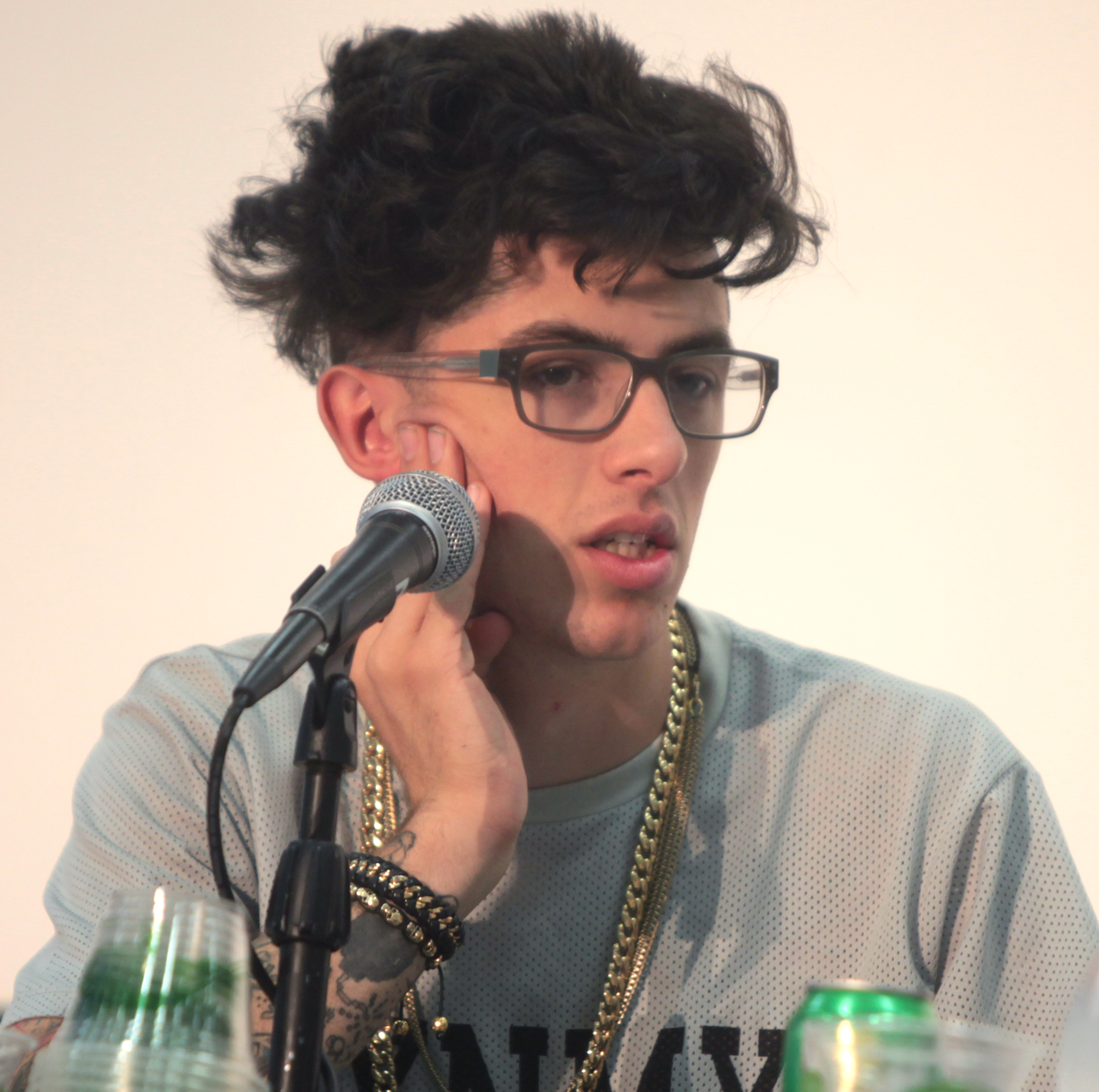
- Pepper in June 2014
- Born: Samuel Nicholas Pepper; 26 March 1989 (age 37); Ashford, Kent, England
- Occupations: Livestreamer; TikToker

Kick information
- Channel: sam
- Years active: 2023–2025
- Followers: 65.6 thousand (15 April 2024)

TikTok information
- Page: sampepper
- Followers: 4.6 million (15 April 2024)

YouTube information
- Channel: sam
- Years active: 2010–present
- Subscribers: 2.29 million (15 April 2024)
- Views: 294.7 million (15 April 2024)

Samuel Nicholas Pepper (born 26 March 1989) is an English internet personality and reality TV contestant. Pepper appeared as a contestant on the 11th series of Big Brother in 2010. Later that same year, he started a YouTube channel, where he initially posted extreme pranks. These pranks often received backlash for featuring assault and cruelty. In 2016 Pepper shifted to vlogging and then again in 2019 shifted to comedy videos, starting a TikTok channel in 2020. In 2021, Pepper worked with FaZe Clan to promote the Save the Kids token pump-and-dump scheme as an independent contractor. Pepper streamed from Kick from 2023, until his ban in 2025.

== Early life ==
Samuel Pepper was born on 26 March 1989 in Ashford, Kent. He is half Greek. He attended Pent Valley Technology College in Cheriton, Kent.

== Career ==
=== Big Brother 11 and early media career (2010–2014) ===
In 2010, Pepper took part in the 11th season of the British reality television series Big Brother as a housemate, entering the house on Day 52 as Laura's replacement, and as part of the "Ignore the Obvious" task. During his time in the house, he got into a verbal fight with John James Parton, and eventual winner Josie Gibson. He was evicted on Day 73 with 14.6% of the public vote.

On 8 September 2010, Pepper created his YouTube channel and began uploading videos, mainly consisting of pranks, voicing himself in Element Animation's The Crack! in 2011. From late-2013 to mid-2014, Pepper, alongside friend and fellow YouTube personality Marius "Maz" Listhrop, began his worldwide comedy tour, "WDGAF Tour".

=== Growth and controversy (2014–2015) ===
==== "Fake Hand Ass Pinch Prank" ====
In September 2014, Pepper uploaded a controversial video titled "Fake Hand Ass Pinch Prank". In the video, Pepper would go up to women and ask for directions before pinching their buttocks. Soon after the video was published, many people online claimed to have been sexually harassed by Pepper in the video, which soon gained mainstream media attention. Subsequently, the hashtag #ReportSamPepper trended on Twitter, along with many people criticising Pepper's actions. Pepper released another video a few days later where women would go behind men and pinch their buttocks. On the same day, he published another video claiming that his first prank was a "social experiment" and that the video was "staged and scripted" with actors, the online claims of "participants" having been fake. He went on to say that bringing attention to the issue of sexual harassment was "the focal point of the experiment", with the harassment claims online being untrue jokes. Pepper removed both of these videos from YouTube shortly after their releases. Rival video blogger Laci Green consequently published a video called "Sam Pepper Exposed", addressing the online harassment allegation campaign against Pepper. Green also wrote an open letter calling on Pepper to "stop violating women and making them uncomfortable on the street for views". The letter received more than 100,000 signatures.

Shortly after the original video was published, multiple women came forward and accused Pepper of sexual misconduct, including soliciting nude photographs from a minor, inappropriate sexual contact, and rape. No charges were filed, and Pepper was not arrested.

==== "Killing Best Friend Prank" ====
In November 2015, Pepper uploaded a video entitled "Killing Best Friend Prank". The video features internet personalities Sam Golbach and Colby Brock. In the video, a masked Pepper kidnaps Golbach and Brock (both of whom were in actuality in on the prank alongside Pepper), who are parked at an unknown location, shoving Golbach into the trunk of the car with a bag over his head. Brock helps Pepper tie up Golbach and take him to a rooftop, where he is forced to watch Pepper "shoot" Brock, leaving Golbach in tears. The video caused a backlash on social media, also hitting media headlines. British newspaper Metro compared the video to an "ISIS-style execution". A subsequent online petition to have Pepper removed from YouTube gained over 100,000 signatures. In an interview with Metro, Pepper stated that the criticism towards the video and himself was "shocking". In the same interview, Golbach stated that the message of the video was "about living life to the full... not taking life for granted and loving it because it's short". In response to the ongoing criticism, Pepper started a GoFundMe campaign, stating that he would delete his YouTube channel if $1.5 million was pledged to him. The campaign was removed shortly afterwards, along with the accompanying video that was posted on his YouTube channel.

=== Apology and rebranding (2016–2021) ===
On 21 February 2016, Pepper made all of his YouTube videos private and deleted all of his tweets, save for one stating "I give up". He uploaded a 20-minute video on 24 February titled "i'm sorry". In the video, Pepper confessed that many of his pranks, including his controversial "Killing Best Friend Prank", were staged. He also denied all online allegations of harassment towards him, attributed to a trolling campaign. He apologised for his videos, calling himself an "idiot" and stated that he would continue uploading on YouTube and "make content that I really believe in". After the video was published, Pepper stopped uploading prank videos and began uploading vlogs, subsequently receiving a more positive response.

In 2018, Pepper stopped uploading on his main channel and rebranded to his "Sam Pepper Live" channel, where he began vlogging and frequently live streaming alongside fellow streamer, Ice Poseidon. The following year, Pepper rebranded once again and became inactive on YouTube, subsequently shifting to TikTok. He mainly posts short comedy videos consisting of "challenge videos, life–hacks, and stunts"; the Metro described his presence on the platform as a "fully-fledged comeback".

==== Save the Kids scandal ====
Beginning in 2021, Pepper worked as an independent contractor at the esports and entertainment company FaZe Clan, consulting on "YouTube channel strategy" with some of the company's founders. According to two former employees, he tried to broker brand deals with Apple Inc. He was living and frequently collaborating with then-FaZe Clan member Frazier Khattri (FaZe Kay), and was accused by Khattri and YouTube investigator Coffeezilla of ordering a developer on the cryptocurrency Save the Kids token to change a mechanism within the currency, which after its change, would allow for the cryptocurrency to be used as a pump and dump scheme. Both Khattri and Pepper have denied substantial involvement in the Save the Kids scandal, though Khattri has come out against Pepper claiming that Pepper's "plan" was to make US$1,000,000 from the token and vanish forever. Pepper has yet to comment specifically on the allegations made by Khattri, who has further vowed never to work or be associated with Pepper ever again. Coffeezilla, however, alleged that Khattri was, contrary to Khattri's claims, significantly involved in Save the Kids from the start.

Immediately subsequent to Khattri's comments, some users on Twitter nicknamed Pepper "Scam Pepper", though Pepper was known to swiftly block anyone who used the nickname. No longer involved with FaZe Clan, he said he was paid by a FaZe member to help with his videos and was subsequently "dragged in to all the drama and later thrown under bus."

=== Return to livestreaming (2022–present) ===
After the Save the Kids crypto scandal, Pepper began livestreaming his travels across various countries - such as Thailand and Indonesia - on Kick. He also collaborated with former streaming partner, Ice Poseidon, on a series of travel-themed streams across India, Thailand, South Korea and Australia.

==== Arrest and release ====
On 21 September 2023, as part of a prank during a stream in Queensland, Australia, Pepper and Ice Poseidon paid an escort $500 to enter their hotel room with the intent of streaming the escort's interactions with another Australian streamer. Pepper and Ice Poseidon agreed to pay an extra fee for recording the interaction, where the camera was shown to the escort immediately upon entering the room. Ed Craven, founder and owner of the streaming platform Kick, was active in the stream chat whilst the events unfolded, sending laughing emotes. During the stream, the escort was contacted by a friend via text message, alerting her to the situation; the woman subsequently attempted to leave the hotel room but was temporarily blocked by the Australian streamer chasing after her.

Later, when Pepper and Ice Poseidon exited the hotel, police officers apprehended the pair and placed them under arrest for sexual assault. They were later released without charge.

==== 2025 India fireworks injury ====
On 20 October 2025, in Delhi, India, Pepper partook in Diwali celebrations; he lit and aimed a small Roman candle–style firework toward another group of people. When a 12-year-old girl was hit in the eye by one of these fireworks, Pepper "celebrated" by raising his fist in the air. He left the country the following day, and initially claiming the injured girl had only received "a cut above her eyebrow", stating her vision was "fine". He was subsequently banned from both Kick and another streaming platform, Pump.fun. Local news media later reported the girl's injury was more serious than "just a cut", sparking public backlash to which Pepper responded in December 2025, admitting the girl had suffered corneal damage and vision loss in one eye. Kick lifted its "permanent ban" on Pepper in February 2026.
