= University of Palermo (Buenos Aires) =

Private university in Argentina

- Universidad de Palermo
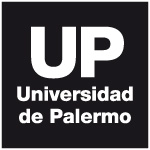
- Type: Private
- Established: 1986; 40 years ago
- Academic affiliations: ISEP, UNESCO, IEEE
- Rector: Ricardo H. Popovsky
- Location: Buenos Aires, Argentina; 34.5974°S 58.4160°W
- Campus: Urban
- Colors
- Website: palermo.edu

The University of Palermo (Spanish: Universidad de Palermo, abbreviated as UP) is a private university in Buenos Aires, Argentina. It has several buildings located in different parts of the city. The university offers several educational programs, including a double degree in Management awarded along with the London School of Economics.

The University of Palermo's library has more than 45,000 volumes, including audio-visual material. The collection can be searched through the Internet.

The university has seven departments with a total of more than 14,000 students, who come from all over the world.

== History ==
In 1986, a group of academics and intellectuals established the Fundación Universidad de Palermo (University of Palermo Foundation), with the idea of creating a university with the same name.

== Ranking ==
According to the QS World University Rankings, UP is ranked 377th in the world.

== International ties ==
The University of Palermo is host to one of the UNESCO chairs, is a member of the ISEP, and a member of AACSB, and its Architecture career has been accredited by the Royal Institute of British Architects. Academic agreements range from the exchange or visit by professors and alumni to joint research projects.

Its engineering department has recently tied as a member of the IEEE.

== Ranking and reputation ==
The Universidad de Palermo has been recognized by the following rankings:

- Top 400 worldwide - Times Higher Education World University Ranking 2015–2016
- Top 431 worldwide - QS World University Rankings 2017–2018
- #61-70 worldwide (#2 in Latin America) among less than 50 years old universities - Ranking QS Top 50 Under 50 2018
- Best for Design in Argentina, among top 4 in South America and among the top 40 worldwide - QS World University Rankings by Subject 2017–2018, Arts and Design
- University with the most international students in South America - QS World University Rankings 2017–2018
- Top 20 South America (Top 10 among privates) - QS World University Rankings 2015–2016
