= Avian (disambiguation) =

Avian may refer to:

- Anything related to birds (animals of the class Aves)

== Aviation ==
- Avro Avian, a series of light aircraft made by Avro in the 1920s and 1930s
- Avian Limited, a hang glider manufacturer founded in 1989

== Places ==
- Avian, Iran, a village in Razavi Khorasan Province, Iran
- Avian, Friulian name of Aviano, a town and comune in northern Italy
- Avian Island, Antarctica
- Avian Tower, a high-rise building in Surabaya, Indonesia

== People ==
- Avian (band), an American heavy metal band
- Avian (given name), Russian male first name
- Bob Avian (1937–2021), American choreographer and theater director

== See also ==
- Avian influenza, a virus adapted to birds
- Evian, a brand of mineral water
- Évian-les-Bains, a commune in eastern France
- Thonon Evian Grand Genève FC, an association football club based in Thonon, France
