= Aviere =

Aviere may refer to:

- avian (disambiguation), in French: Avière
- airman, in Italian: Aviere
