= Al-Majdoul Tower =

- برج المجدول
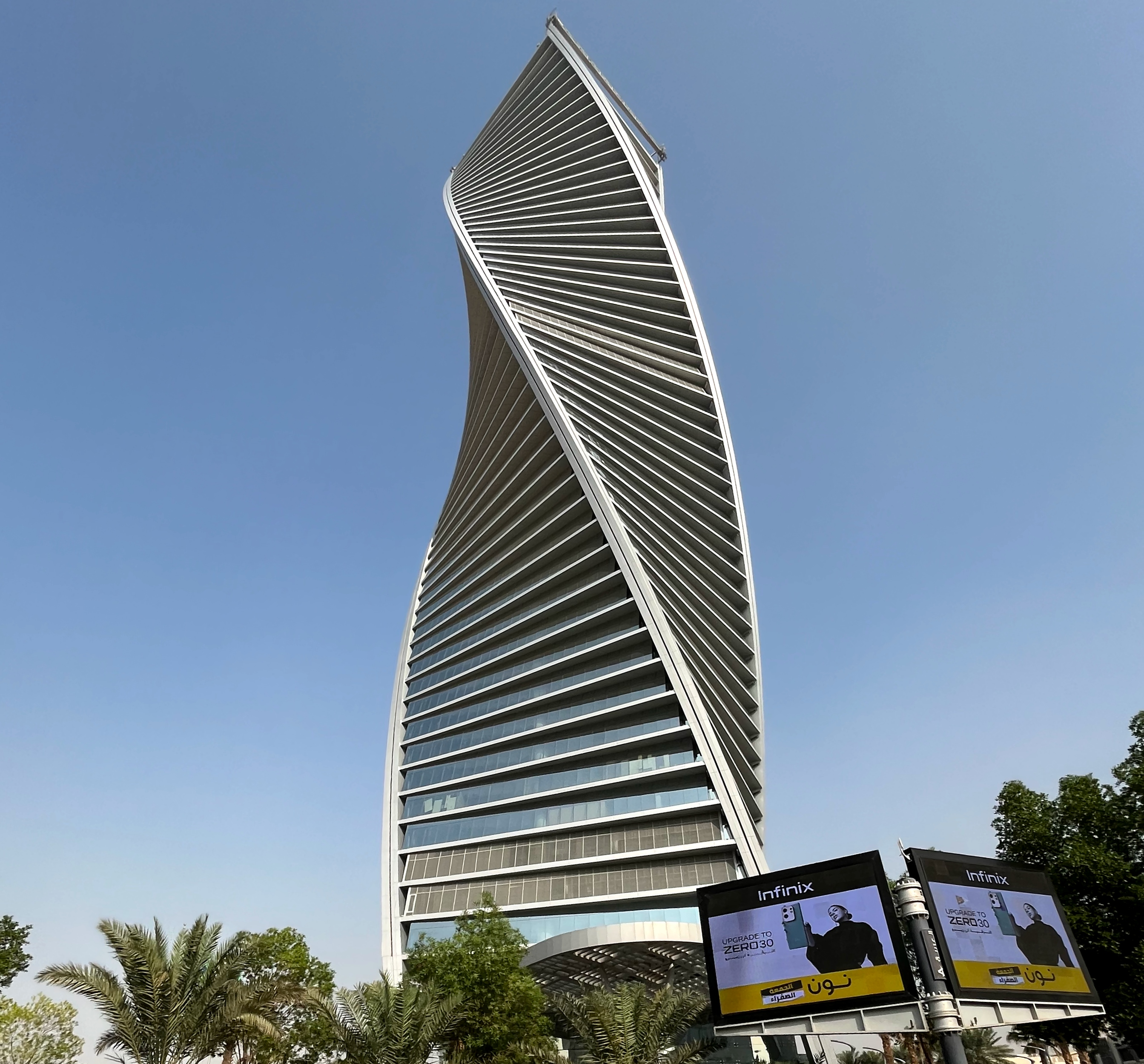
- Majdoul Tower, 2023

General information
- Status: Completed
- Type: Offices
- Location: Riyadh, Saudi Arabia
- Coordinates: 24.7391°N 46.6593°E
- Construction started: July 2012
- Completed: June 2019
- Cost: 400,000,000 SR
- Owner: Awtad Real Estate

Height
- Tip: 244.55 m (802.3 ft)

Technical details
- Floor count: 54
- Floor area: 1592
- Lifts/elevators: 24

Design and construction
- Architect: Zeidler
- Structural engineer: Halsall
- Main contractor: UNEC for concrete works, No main Contractor

Al-Majdoul Tower (Arabic: برج المجدول, lit. 'Twister Tower') is a commercial twisted skyscraper in the King Fahd District of Riyadh, Saudi Arabia. When it opened, at a height of 244 meters (801 ft), it was the eighth tallest building in Riyadh and twelfth tallest in Saudi Arabia. The tower was constructed from 2012 to 2019 and cost around US$106.6 million. It was selected as one of the zones of Riyadh Season entertainment festival in 2022.

== See also ==
- List of twisted buildings
- List of tallest buildings in Saudi Arabia
