= Al-Masa Tower =

Proposed skyscraper in Jeddah, Saudi Arabia

Burj Almasa
- برج الماسة
- Former names: The Diamond; Diamond Tower

General information
- Status: Under Construction
- Type: Residential
- Location: Jeddah, Saudi Arabia
- Coordinates: 21°38′49″N 39°06′13″E
- Groundbreaking: 9 January 2010
- Construction started: 9 January 2011
- Estimated completion: 2028
- Cost: $1.1 billion

Height
- Architectural: 432 m (1,417 ft)

Technical details
- Floor count: 94

Design and construction
- Architect: Buroj Engineering Consultant
- Main contractor: Al-Masarat For Construction Co., Ltd.

Al-Masa Tower (Arabic: برج الماسة, romanized: Burj al-Masa, lit. 'The Diamond Tower') is a planned 94-story, 432-metre (1,417 ft) supertall skyscraper in Jeddah, Saudi Arabia.

The tower is designed primarily for residential use. When completed, it is anticipated to be Saudi Arabia's second-tallest building as well as one of the tallest residential buildings globally. Upon completion, Burj Almasa will uniquely twist a full 360 degrees along its height.

The initial 12 floors will accommodate parking facilitated close to each residence, with vehicles being transported via specially constructed ramps. The top level of the tower will feature three upscale restaurants.

== Construction ==
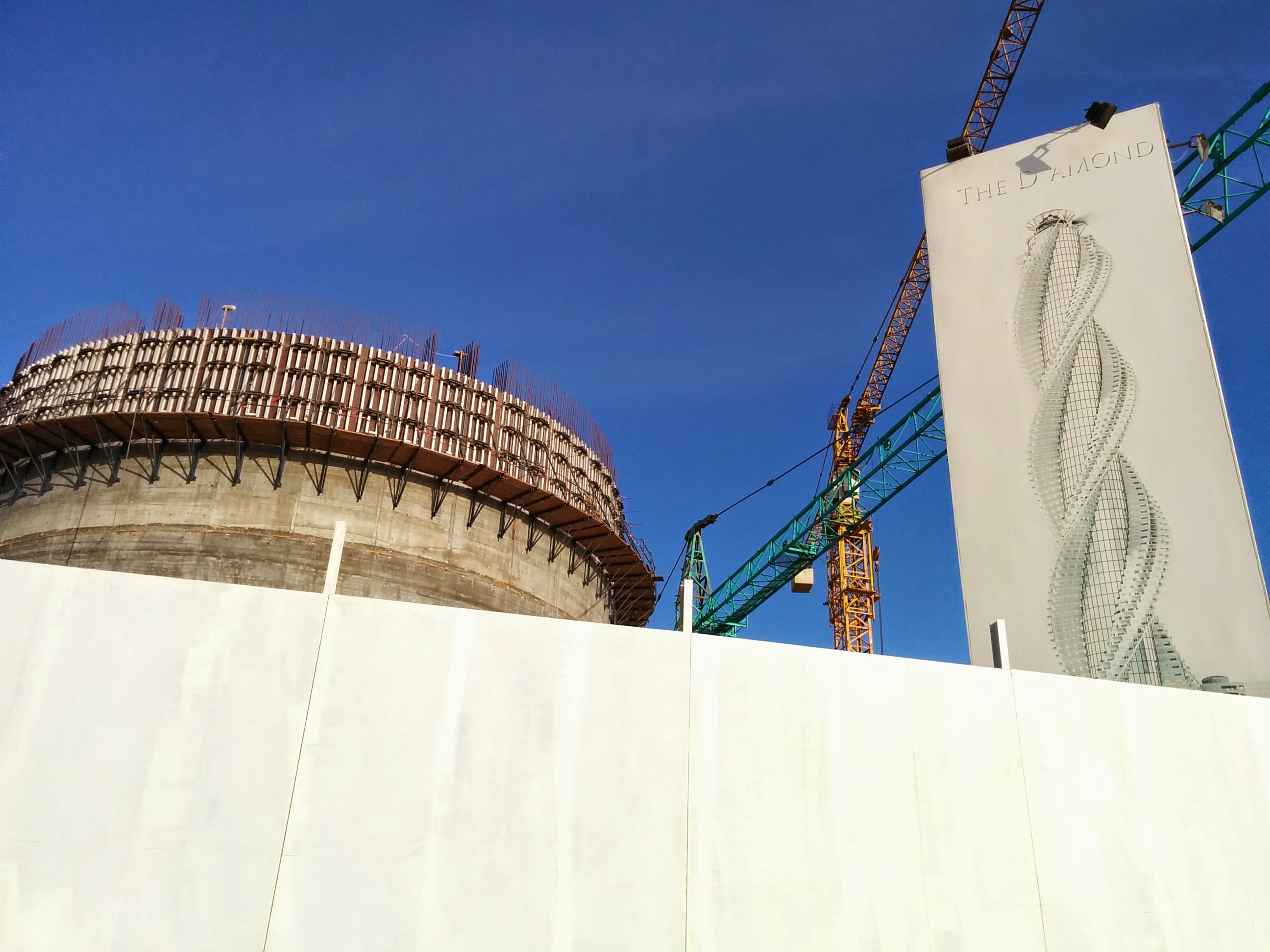
Diamond Tower sign

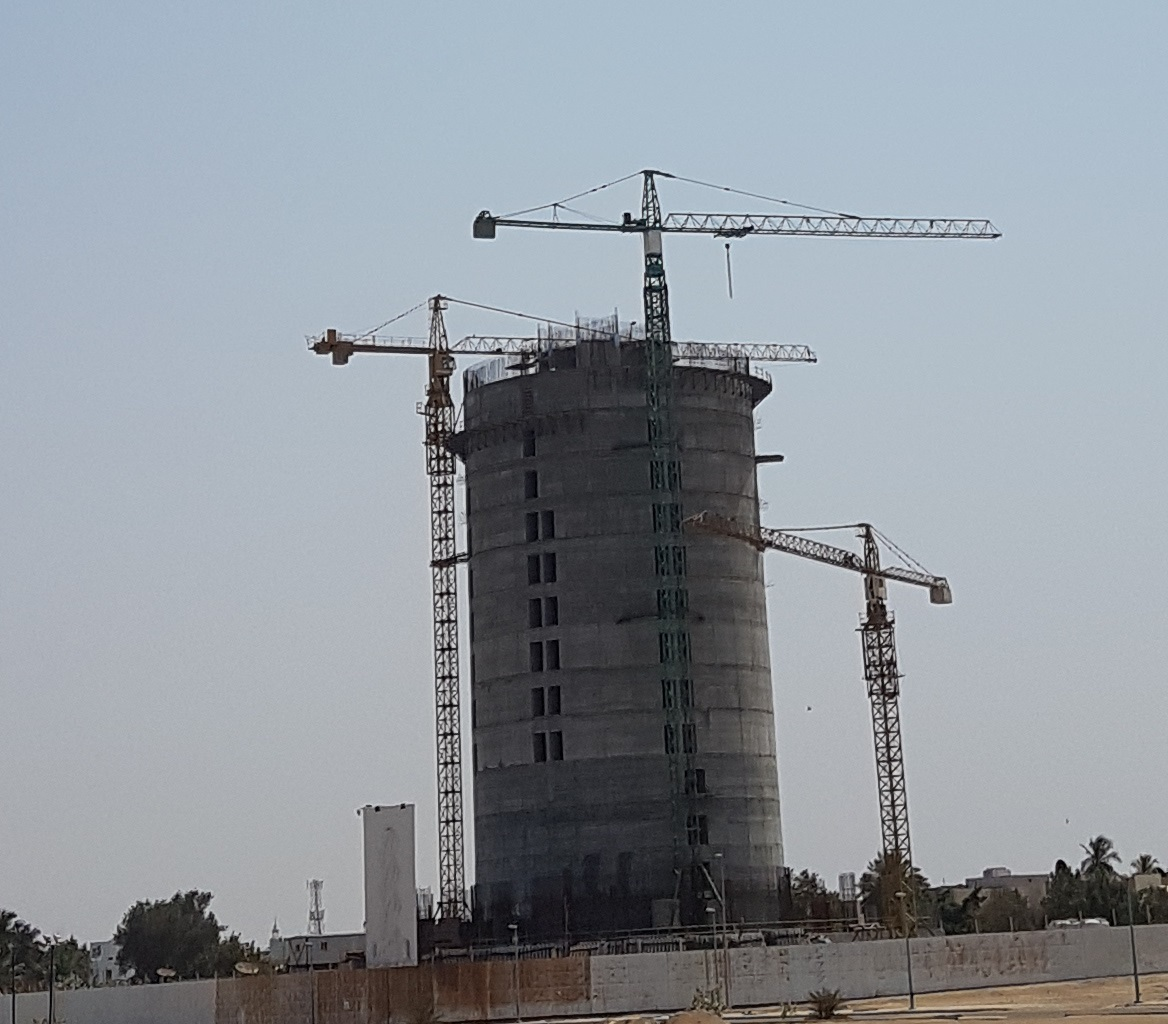
Construction progress as of 27 June 2016

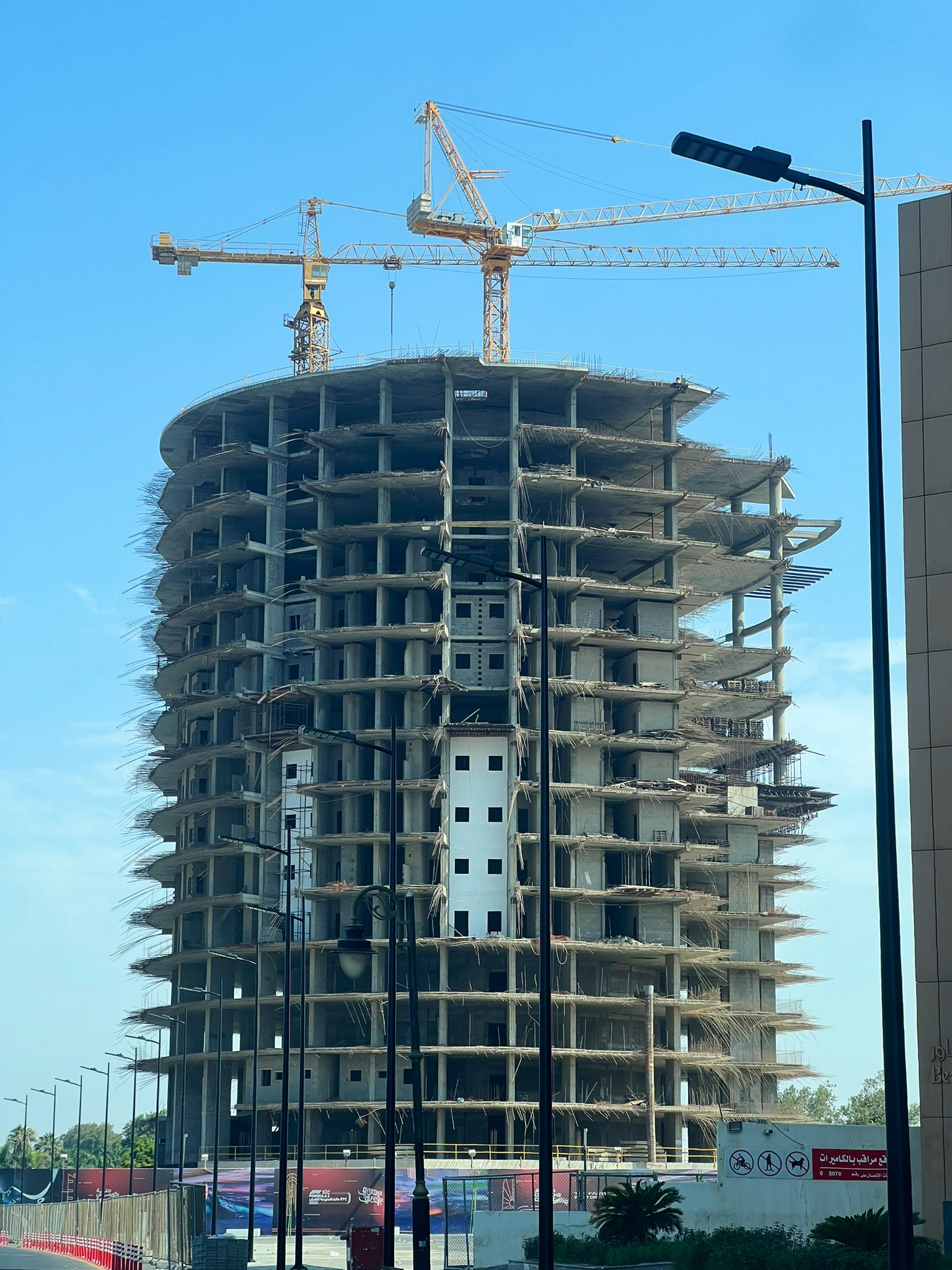
Construction progress as of 26 September 2022

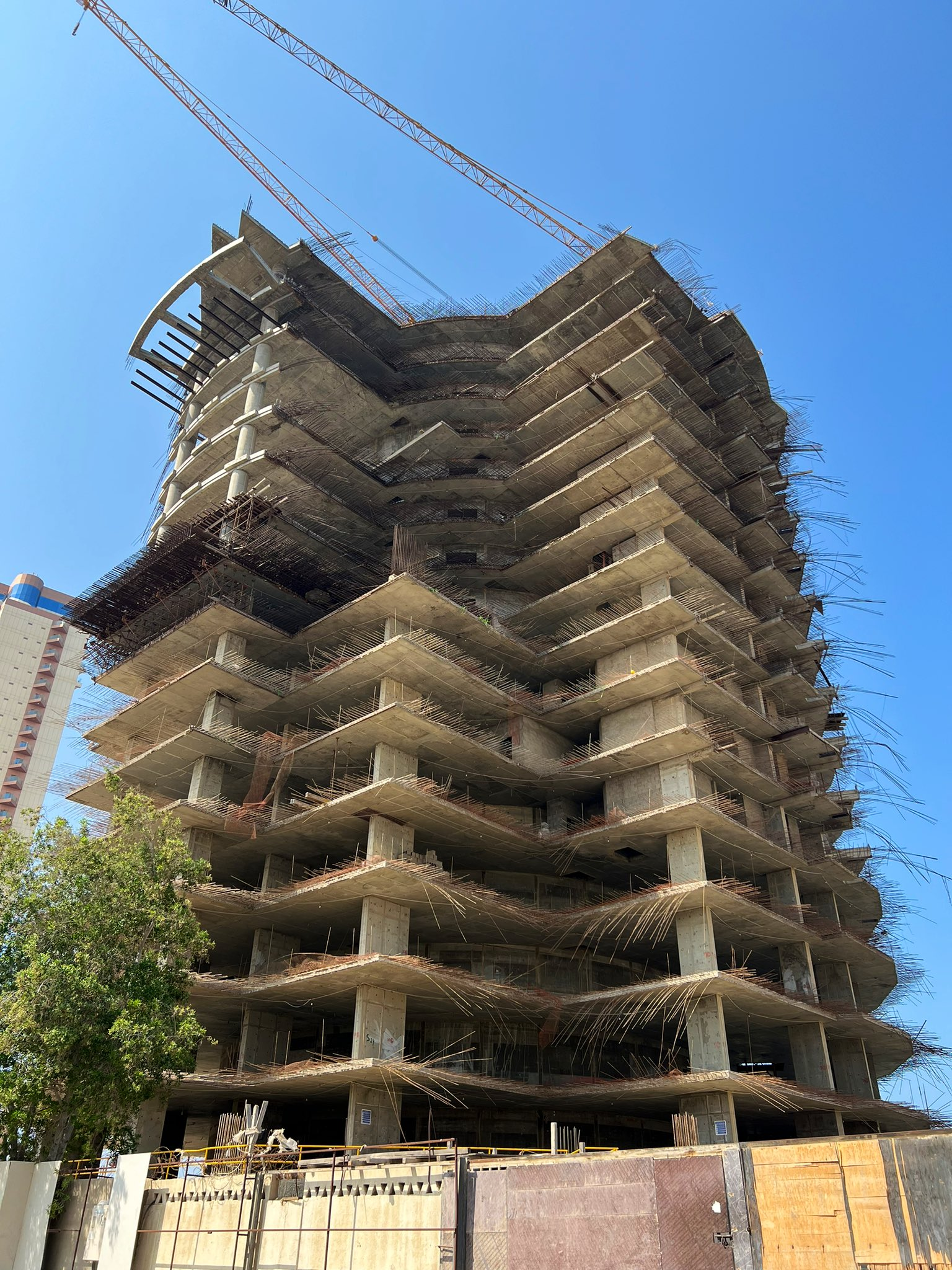
Construction progress as of 10 October 2022

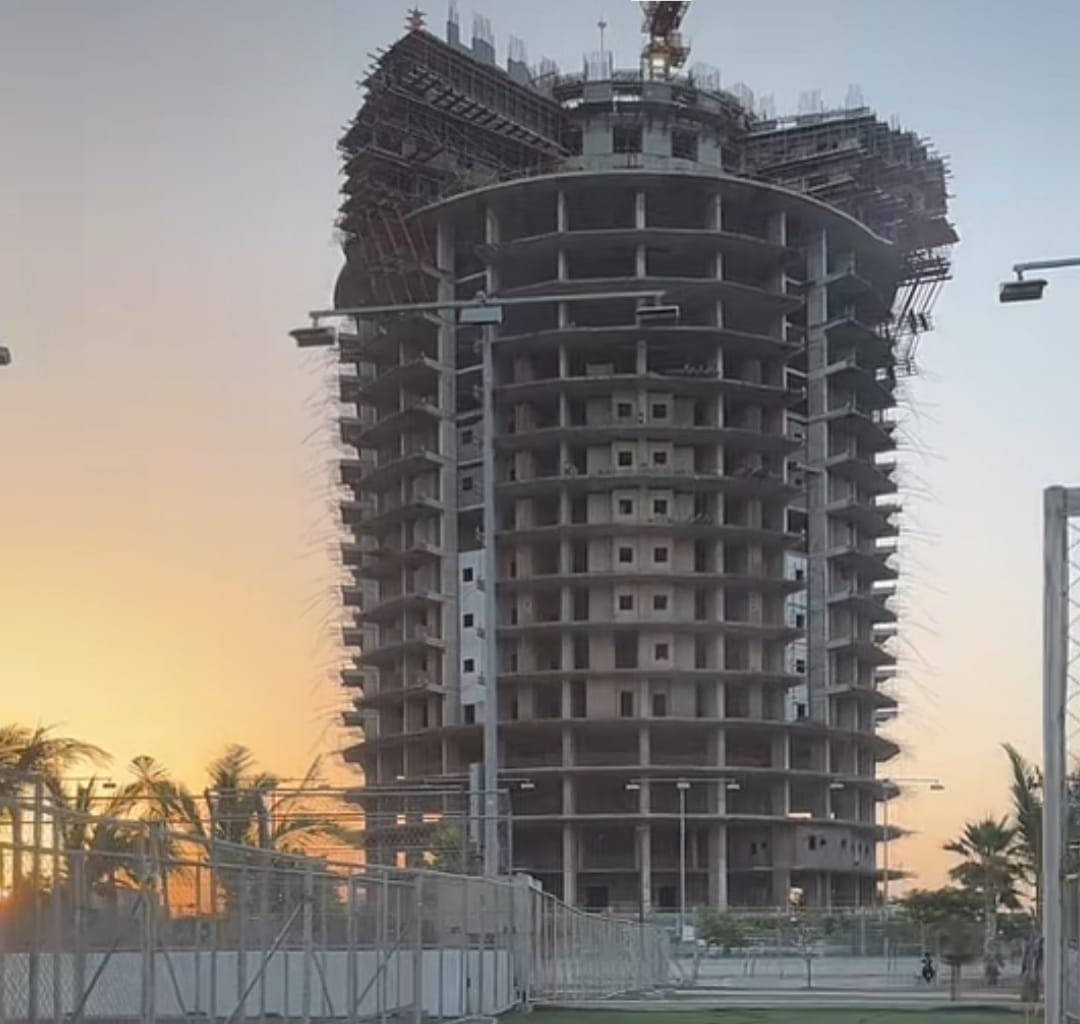
Construction progress as of 11 May 2023

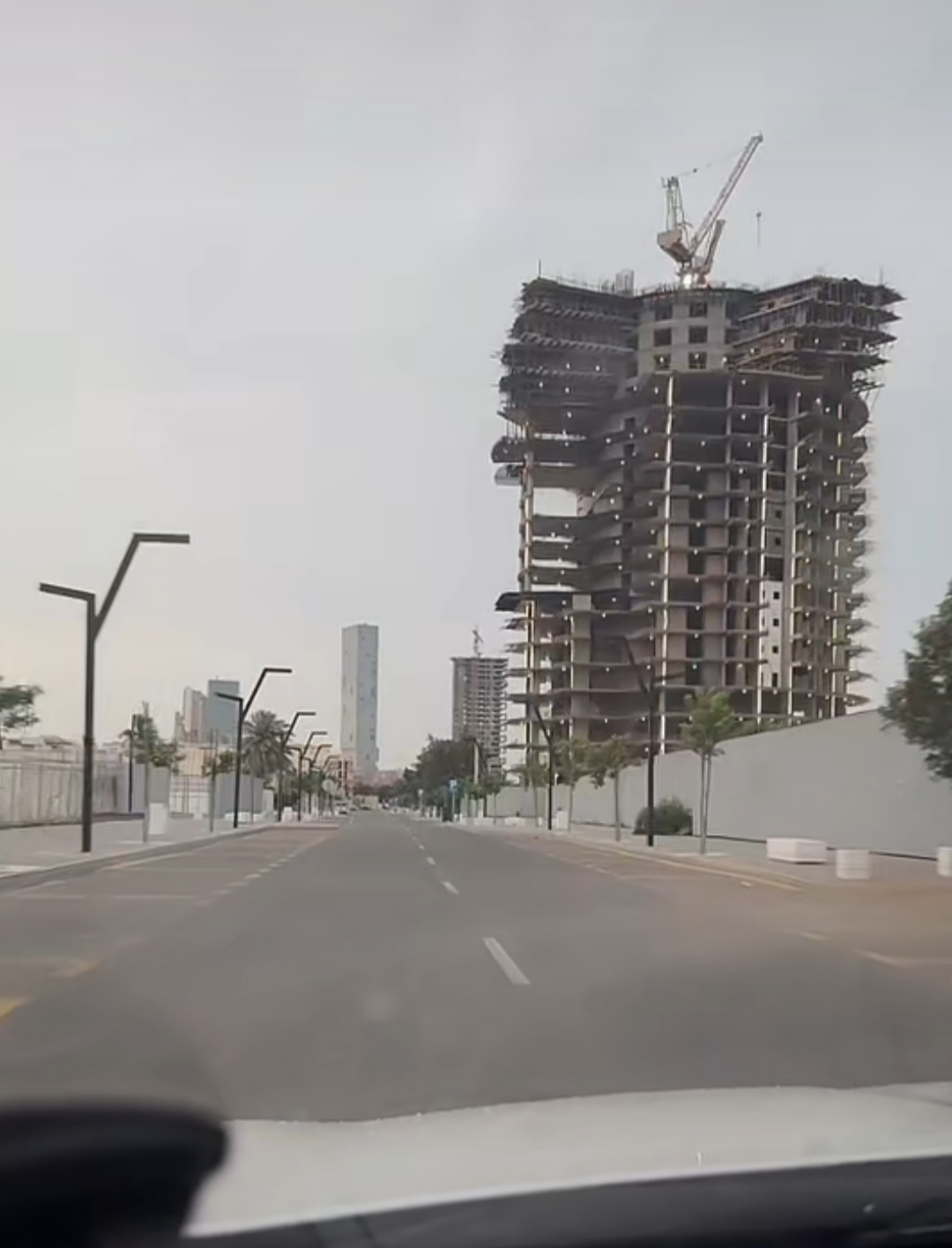
Construction progress as of 29 May 2023

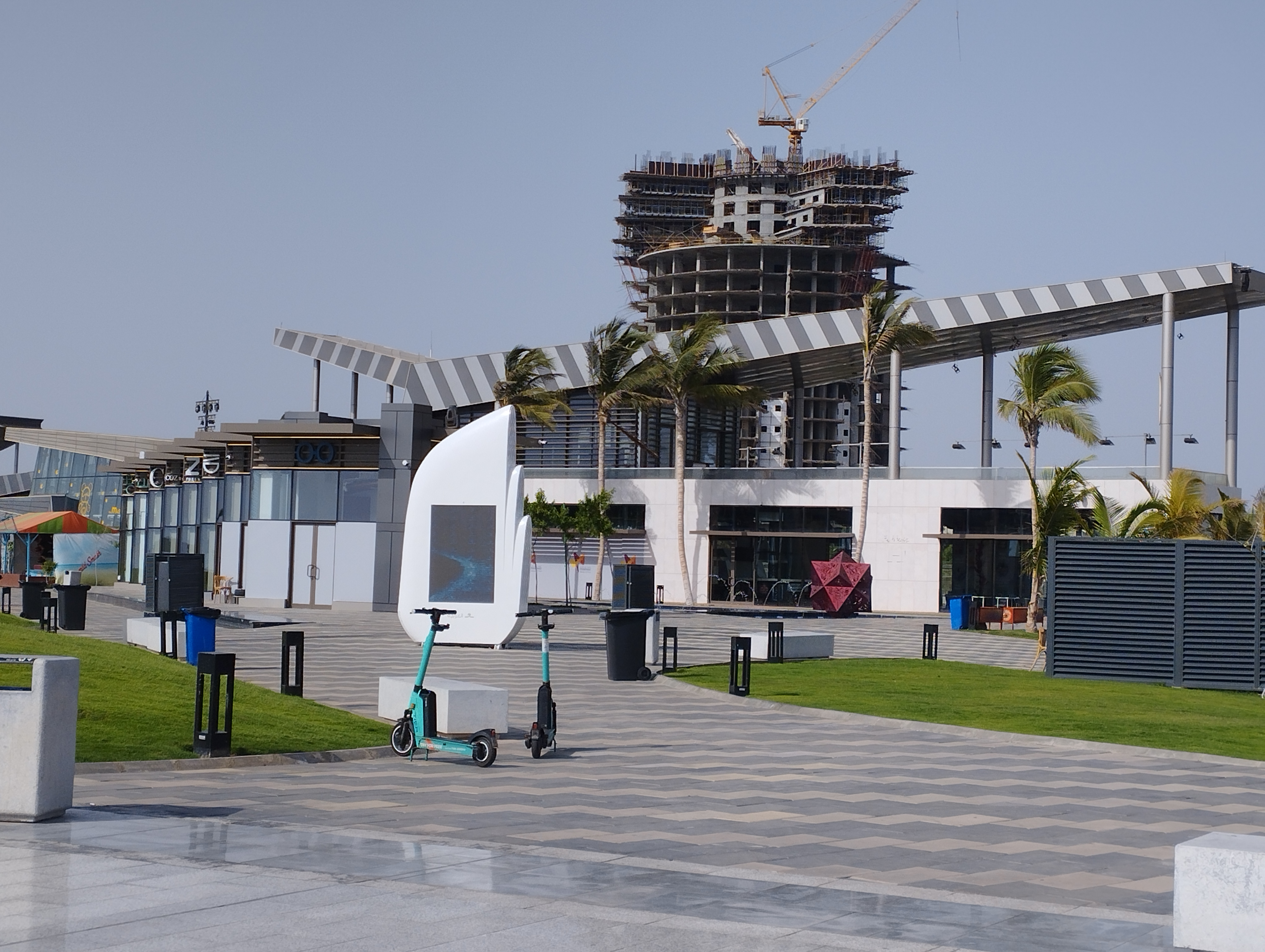
Construction progress as of 23 June 2023

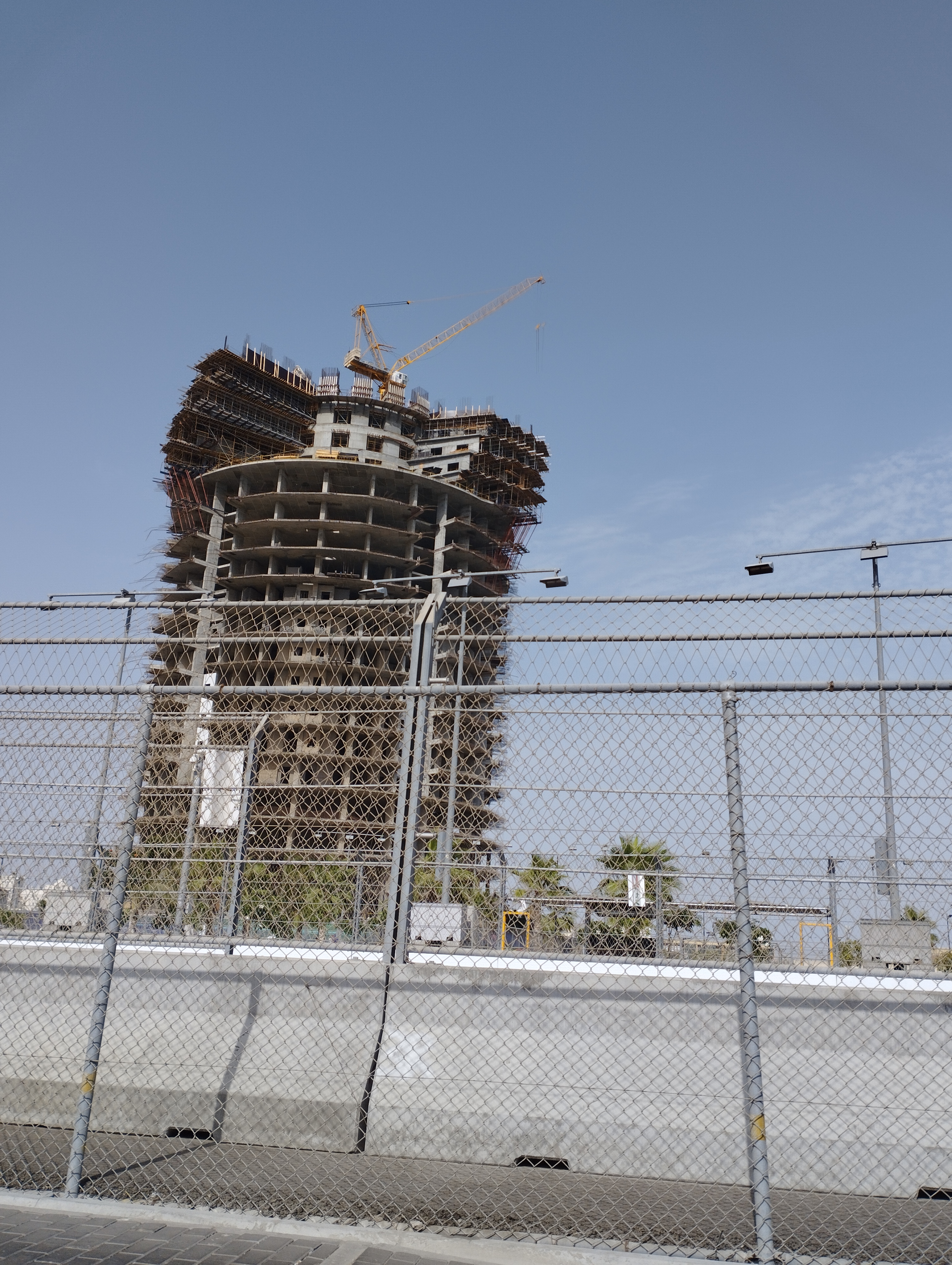
Construction progress as of 23 June 2023

== See also ==
- List of tallest buildings in Saudi Arabia
- List of tallest buildings in the world
- List of tallest residential buildings in the world
- List of twisted buildings
- List of future tallest buildings
