= List of twisted buildings =

Buildings can appear to be twisted by design, where the twisting (torsion, helix, etc.) is structural rather than merely an ornamental detail. The Council on Tall Buildings and Urban Habitat defines a twisting building as one that progressively rotates its floor plates or its façade as it gains height. There are 48 spiraled skyscrapers, and 8 more are under construction.

Turning Torso, in Malmö, Sweden is regarded as the first twisted tower or building. It was designed by Santiago Calatrava and was completed in 2005. When completed, Diamond Tower will be the only building to twist a full 360 degrees along its height. F&F Tower, in Panama City, holds the record for the tightest twist, that is, the highest average rotation per floor, at 5.943 degrees across each of its 53 floors; and as of 2017, it is the completed building with the highest total rotation, with 315 degrees.

== List of tallest twisted buildings ==
The following list includes completed or topped-out buildings sorted by height. Buildings under construction are shaded in grey.

Rank	Image	Name	City	Height in m (ft)	Floor count	Completion year	Average floor rotation	Total rotation
1		Shanghai Tower	Shanghai, China	632 m (2,073 ft)	128	2015	0.938°	120°
2		Lakhta Center	Saint Petersburg, Russia	462 m (1,516 ft)	87	2019	1.047°	90°
3		Burj Almasa	Jeddah, Saudi Arabia	432 m (1,417 ft)	93	2028	3.871°	360°
4		Huaqiang Golden Corridor City Plaza Main Tower	Shenyang, China	327 m (1,073 ft)	66	2023		
5		Telekom Tower	Kuala Lumpur, Malaysia	310 m (1,020 ft)	55	2001		
6		Ocean Heights	Dubai, United Arab Emirates	310 m (1,020 ft)	83	2010	0.482°	40°
7		Cayan Tower	Dubai, United Arab Emirates	306 m (1,004 ft)	73	2013	1.233°	90°
8		Wasl Tower	Dubai, United Arab Emirates	302	64	2025		70°
9		Shimao Qianhai Center	Shenzhen, China	294.3 m (966 ft)	63	2020	0.714°	45°
10		Crown Sydney	Sydney, Australia	271.3 m (890 ft)	75	2020	0.8°	60°
11		Capital Diamond Tower	The New Capital, Egypt	260 m (850 ft)	66	2028	4°	212°
12		Regent Emirates Pearl	Abu Dhabi, United Arab Emirates	255 m (837 ft)	52	2016	0.481°	25°
13		Karlatornet (Karla Tower)	Gothenburg, Sweden	246 m (807 ft)	74	2024	°	90°
14		Ningbo Bank of China Headquarters	Ningbo, China	246 m (807 ft)	50	2016	1.2°	60°
15		Evolution Tower	Moscow, Russia	246 m (807 ft)	55	2015	2.836°	156°
16		F&F Tower	Panama City, Panama	243 m (797 ft)	53	2011	5.943°	315°
17		Al Majdoul Tower	Riyadh, Saudi Arabia	244.5 m (802 ft)	54	2019	2.5°	135°
18		Azrieli Sarona Tower	Tel Aviv, Israel	238.5 m (782 ft)	61	2017		
19		Vakif Bank HQ Tower 1	Istanbul, Turkey	222 m (728 ft)	52	2023		
20		Al Tijaria Tower	Kuwait City, Kuwait	218 m (715 ft)	41	2009	4.3°	180°
21		Naza Tower 1	Kuala Lumpur, Malaysia	215.5 m (707 ft)	50	2015		
22		SOCAR Tower	Baku, Azerbaijan	209 m (686 ft)	42	2016	1.2°	40°
23		Barcelona Tower	Tirana, Albania	202 m (663 ft)	50	2030	0.712°	35.6°
24		United Tower	Manama, Bahrain	200 m (660 ft)	47	2016	3.83°	180°
25		Al Bidda Tower	Doha, Qatar	197 m (646 ft)	44	2009	1.364°	60°
26		Turning Torso	Malmö, Sweden	190 m (620 ft)	57	2005	1.579°	90°
27		United Tower	Bahrain Bay, Bahrain	189.2 m (621 ft)	48	2016		
28		Paradox Hotel Vancouver	Vancouver, Canada	188 m (617 ft)	63	2016	0.714°	45°
29		Dance Of Light tower	Chongqing, China	180 m (590 ft)	39	2022	2.045°	90°
30		Generali Tower (lo Storto)	Milan, Italy	177 m (581 ft)	44	2017	1.127°	49.6°
31		Absolute World (Building D)	Mississauga, Canada	176 m (577 ft)	56	2012	3.732°	209°
32		Avaz Twist Tower	Sarajevo, Bosnia and Herzegovina	172 m (564 ft)	39	2008	2.8°	90°
33		Mode Gakuen Spiral Towers	Nagoya, Japan	170 m (560 ft)	38	2008	3°	114°
34		Ministry of Taxes	Baku, Azerbaijan	168 m (551 ft)	32	2021	5°	88°
35		Naza Tower 2	Kuala Lumpur, Malaysia	166 m (545 ft)	38	2015		
36		Absolute World (Building E)	Mississauga, Canada	158 m (518 ft)	50	2012	4°	200°
37		Hamedina square tower 1	Tel Aviv, Israel	156 m (511 ft)	40	2026	1.25°	50°
37		Hamedina square tower 2	Tel Aviv, Israel	156 m (511 ft)	40	2026	1.25°	50°
39		Vakıf Bank HQ Tower 2	Istanbul, Turkey	152 m (499 ft)	36	2023		
40		Hamedina square tower 3	Tel Aviv, Israel	150 m (492 ft)	37	2026	1.25°	46°
41		Baltimore Tower	London, United Kingdom	149 m (489 ft)	44	2017	2.182°	96°
42		Axis Towers (ka)	Tbilisi, Georgia	147 m (482 ft)	37	2020		
43		CORE 31 "Cúspide"	Huixquilucan, Mexico	145 m (476 ft)	38	2020	2.50°	90°
44		The Point	Guayaquil, Ecuador	137 m (449 ft)	36	2014	5.833°	210°
45		Sichuan Radio and Television Centre	Chengdu, China	136 m (446 ft)	31	2010	2.903°	90°
46		One High Line (Western Tower)	New York City, United States	123 m (402 ft)	34	2023		
47		Ayia Napa Marina Towers	Ayia Napa, Cyprus	118 m (388 ft)	28	2020	3.2°	90°
48		Property Tower Baku	Baku, Azerbeijan	114 m (375 ft)	32	2022		
49		PwC Tower	Midrand, South Africa	106 m (348 ft)	26	2018	1.154°	30°
50		Xiamen Suiwa Tower	Xiamen, China	100 m (330 ft)	22	TBA	4.091°	90°
51		Grove at Grand Bay (north tower)	Miami, United States	94 m (308 ft)	21	2016	1.843°	38.7°
51		Grove at Grand Bay (south tower)	Miami, United States	94 m (308 ft)	21	2016	1.843°	38.7°
52		Tao Zhu Yin Yuan	Taipei, Taiwan	93 m (305 ft)	21	2018	4.286°	90°
53		One High Line (Eastern Tower)	New York City, United States	90 m (297 ft)	25	2023		
54		Avian Tower	Surabaya, Indonesia	84 m (276 ft)	20	2018	3°	60°
55		Opus Hong Kong	Hong-Kong	42.6 m (140 ft)	12	2012		

== See also ==
- List of twisted spires
- Canton Tower
