= F&F Tower =

Office tower in Panama City, Panama

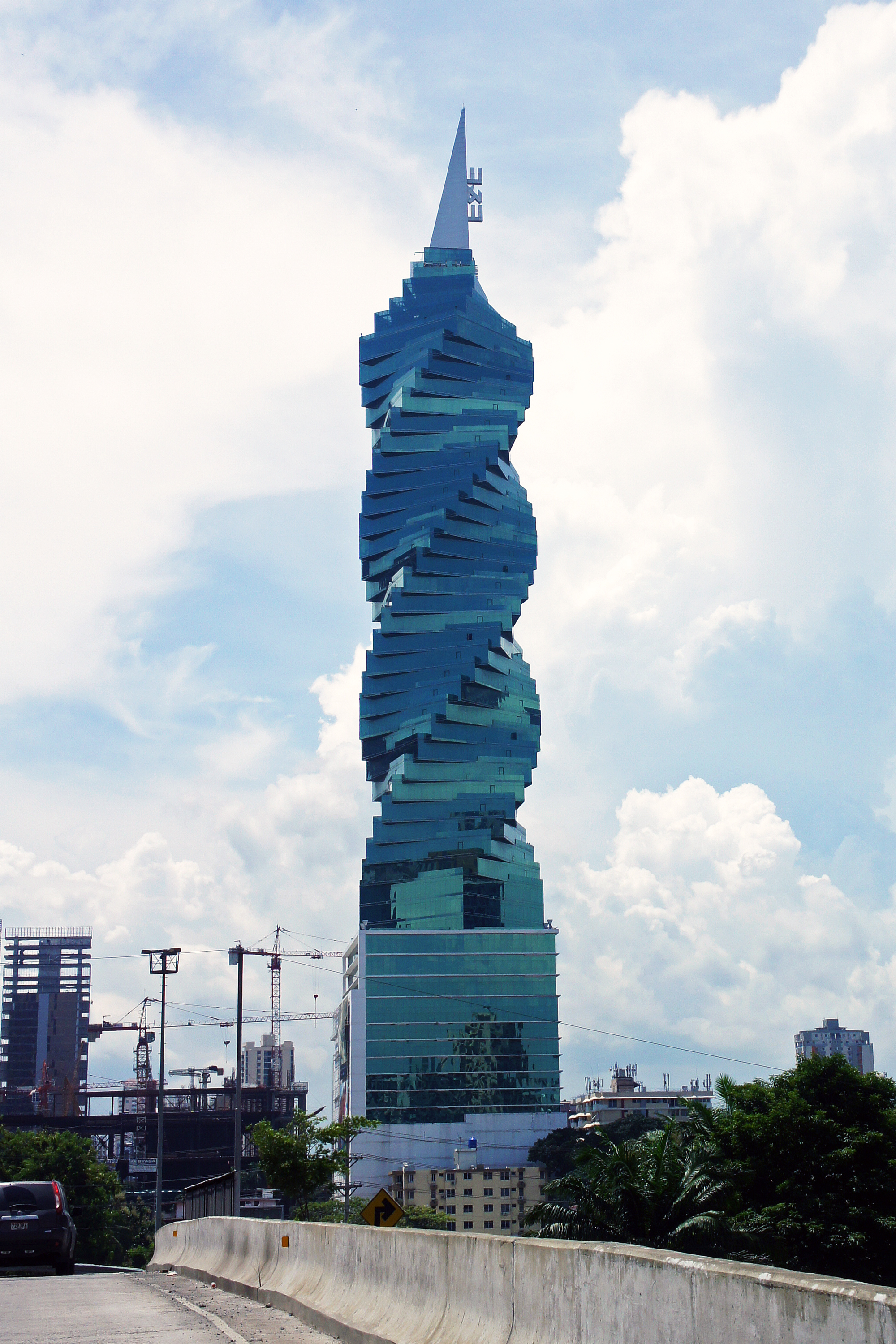
- F&F Tower, Panama City
- Interactive map of the F&F Tower area

General information
- Status: Completed
- Type: Office
- Location: Calle 50, Area Bancaria, Panama City, Panama
- Coordinates: 8.9830°N 79.5185°W
- Construction started: 2008
- Completed: 2011

Height
- Roof: 242.9 m (797 ft)

Technical details
- Floor count: 52
- Floor area: 60,753 m^{2} (653,940 ft^{2})

Design and construction
- Architects: Pinzón Lozano & Asociados
- Developer: F&F Properties Ltd. Inc.

The F&F Tower (previously known as the Revolution Tower and locally nicknamed the Corkscrew or the Screw) is a 242.9-meter (796 ft) 52-story office skyscraper completed in 2011 in Panama City, Panama designed by Pinzon Lozano & Asociados Arquitectos. The tower is constructed of glass and reinforced concrete.

== Gallery ==
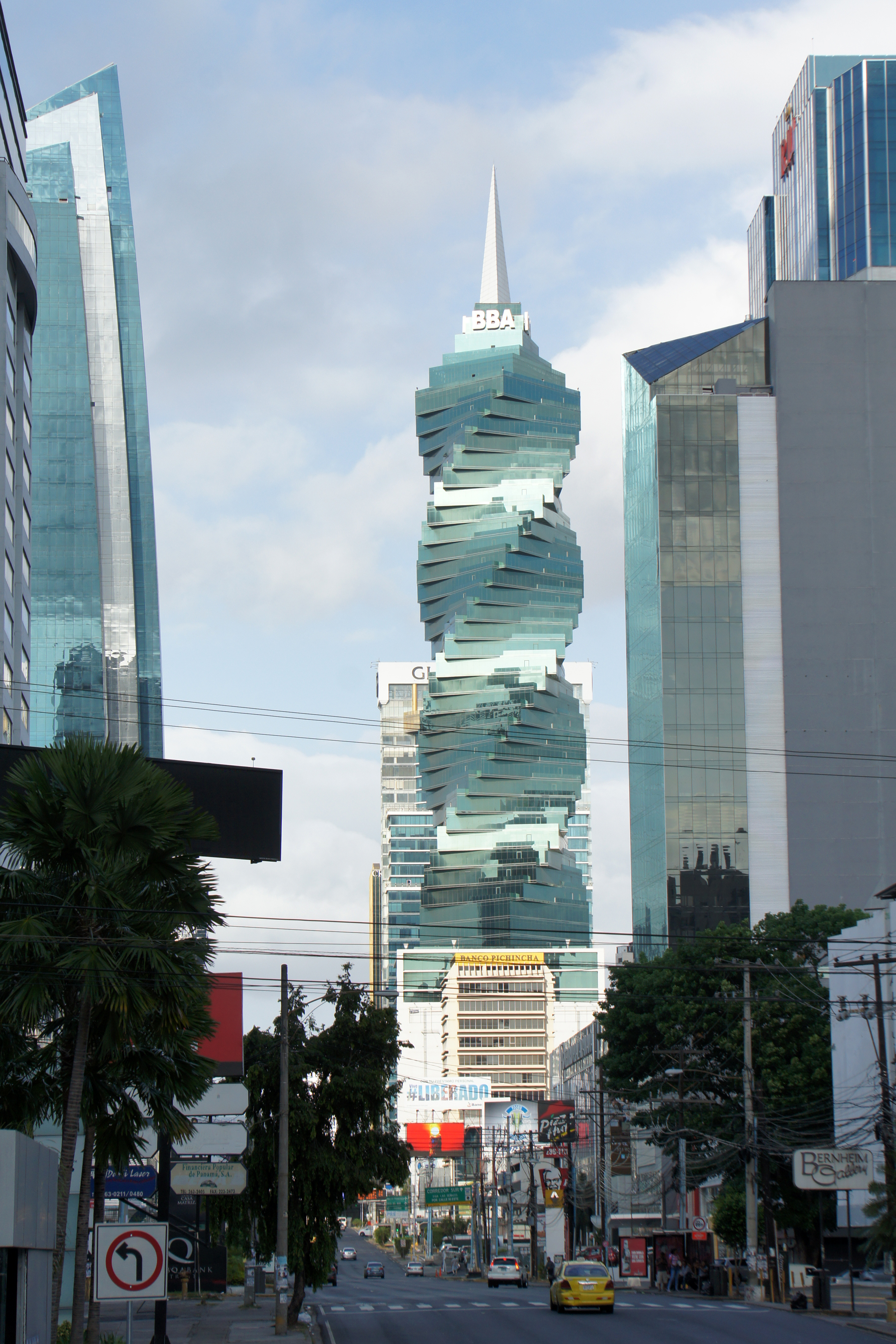

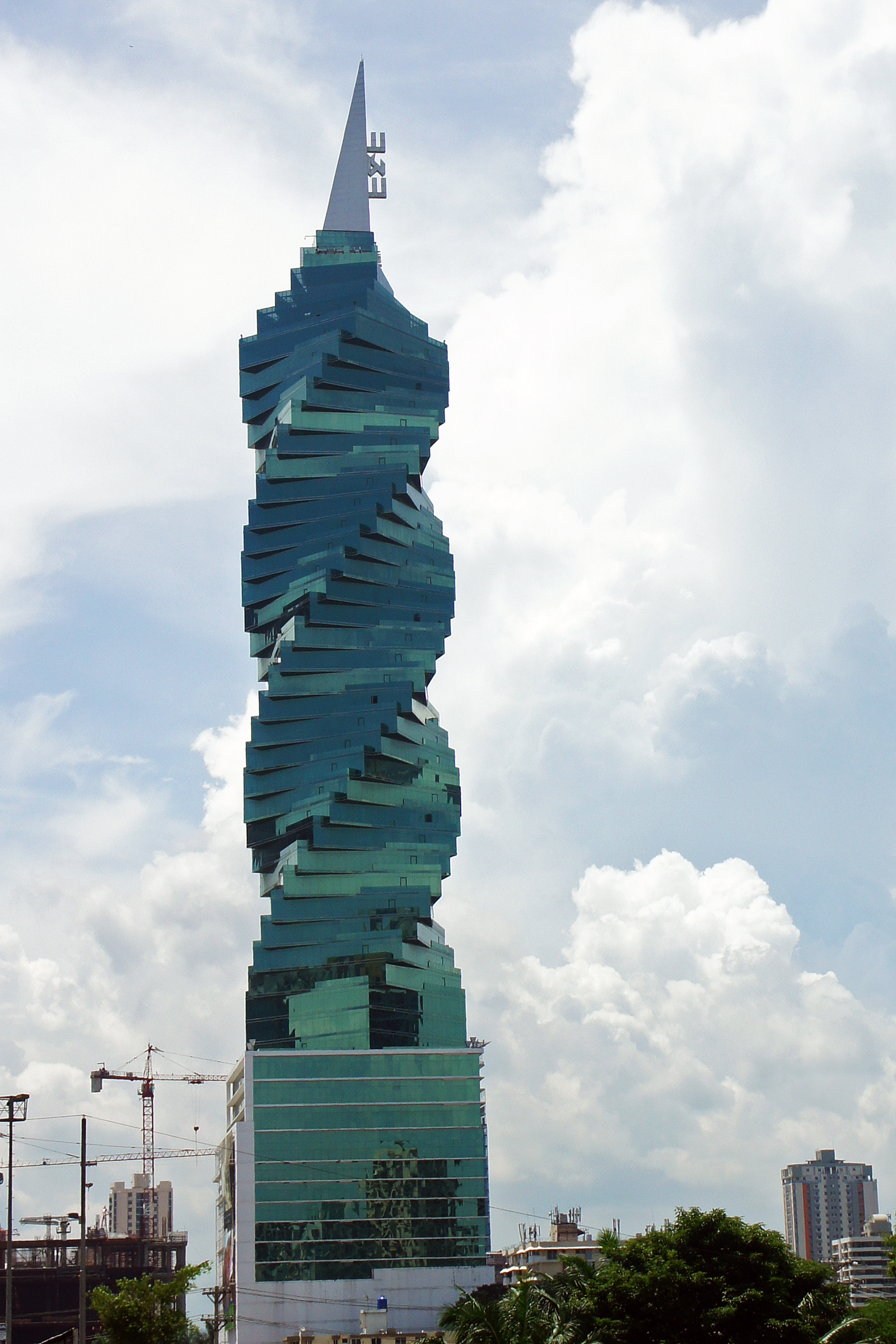

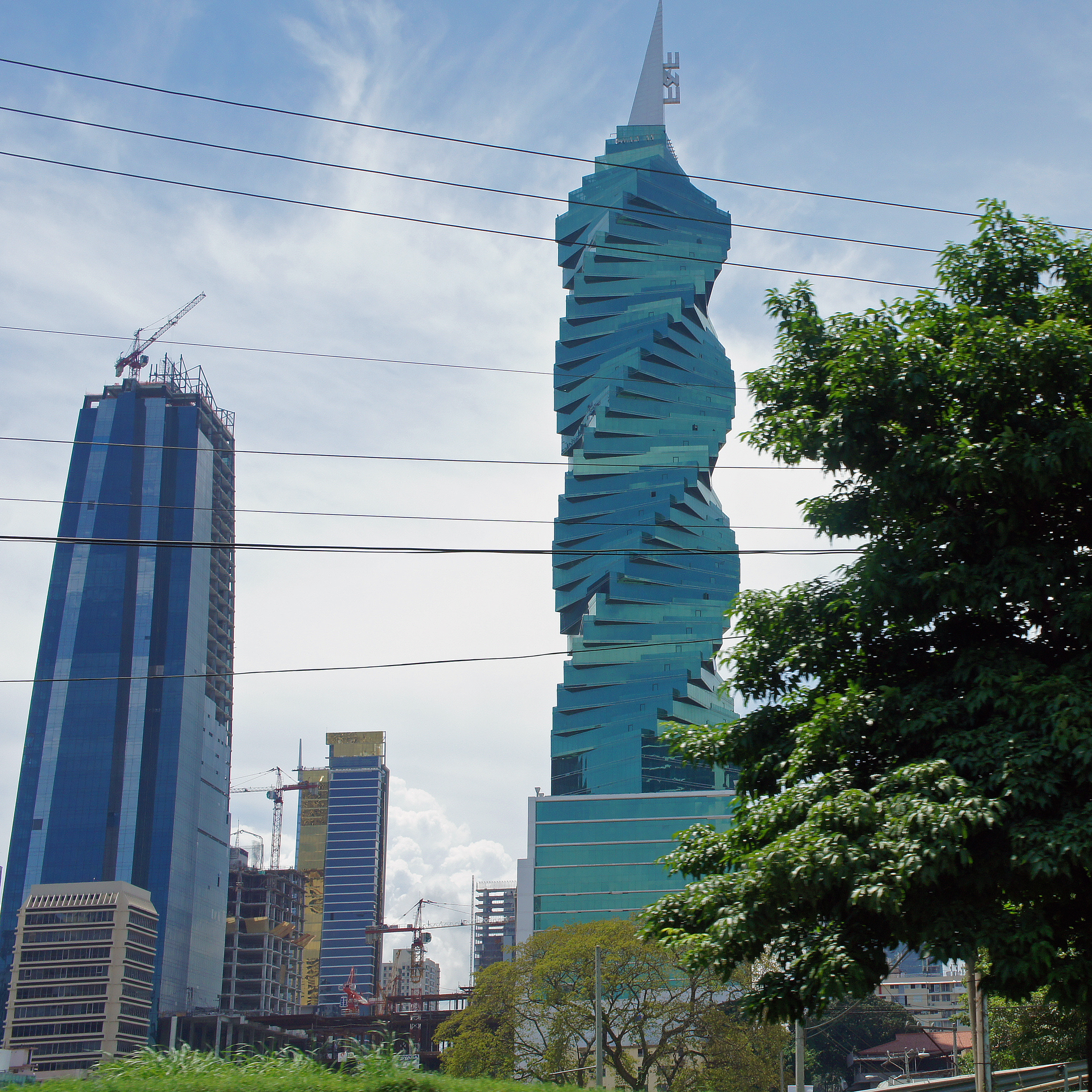

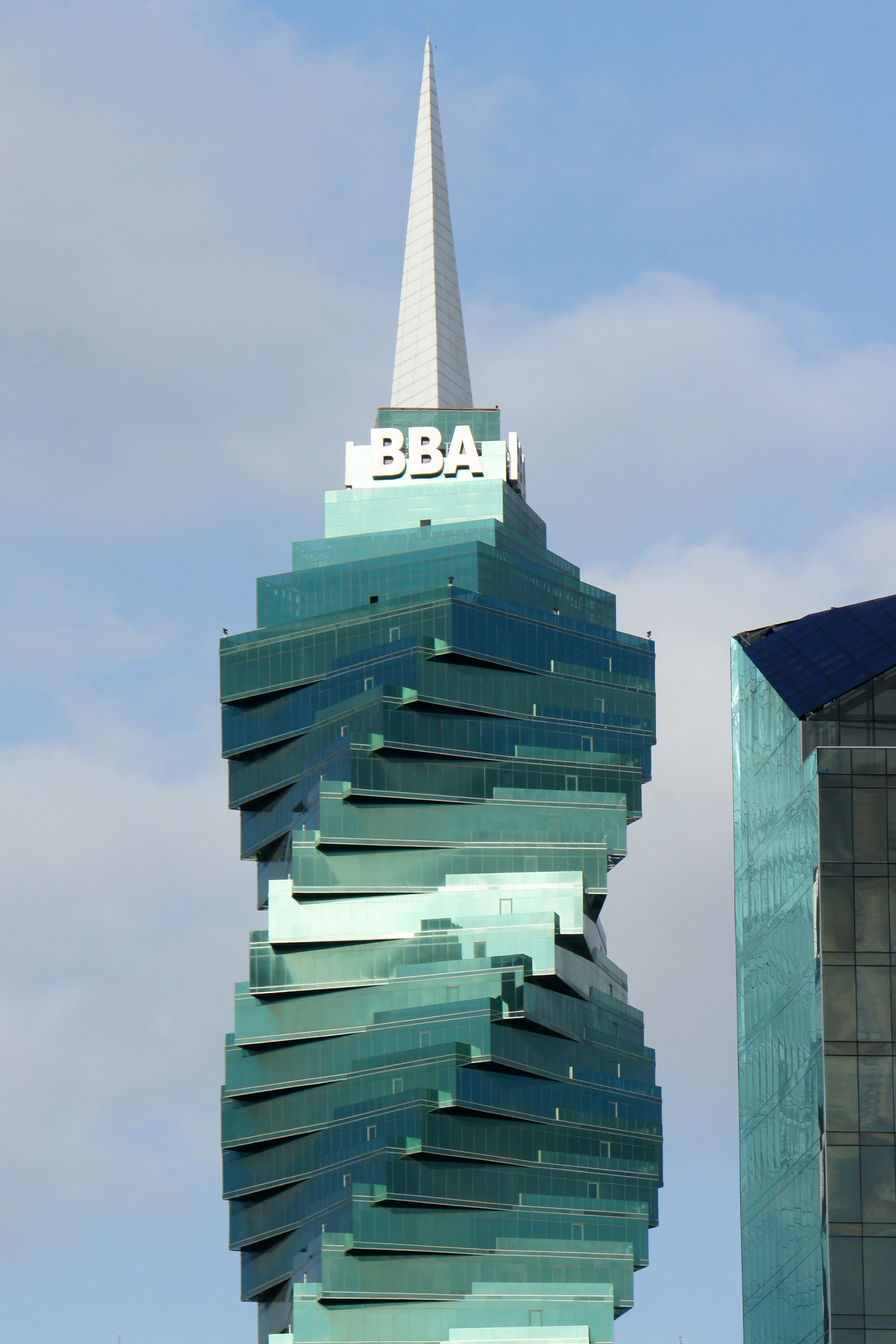

== See also ==
- List of tallest buildings in Panama City
- List of twisted buildings
