= Baltimore Tower =

Residential skyscraper on the Isle of Dogs, London

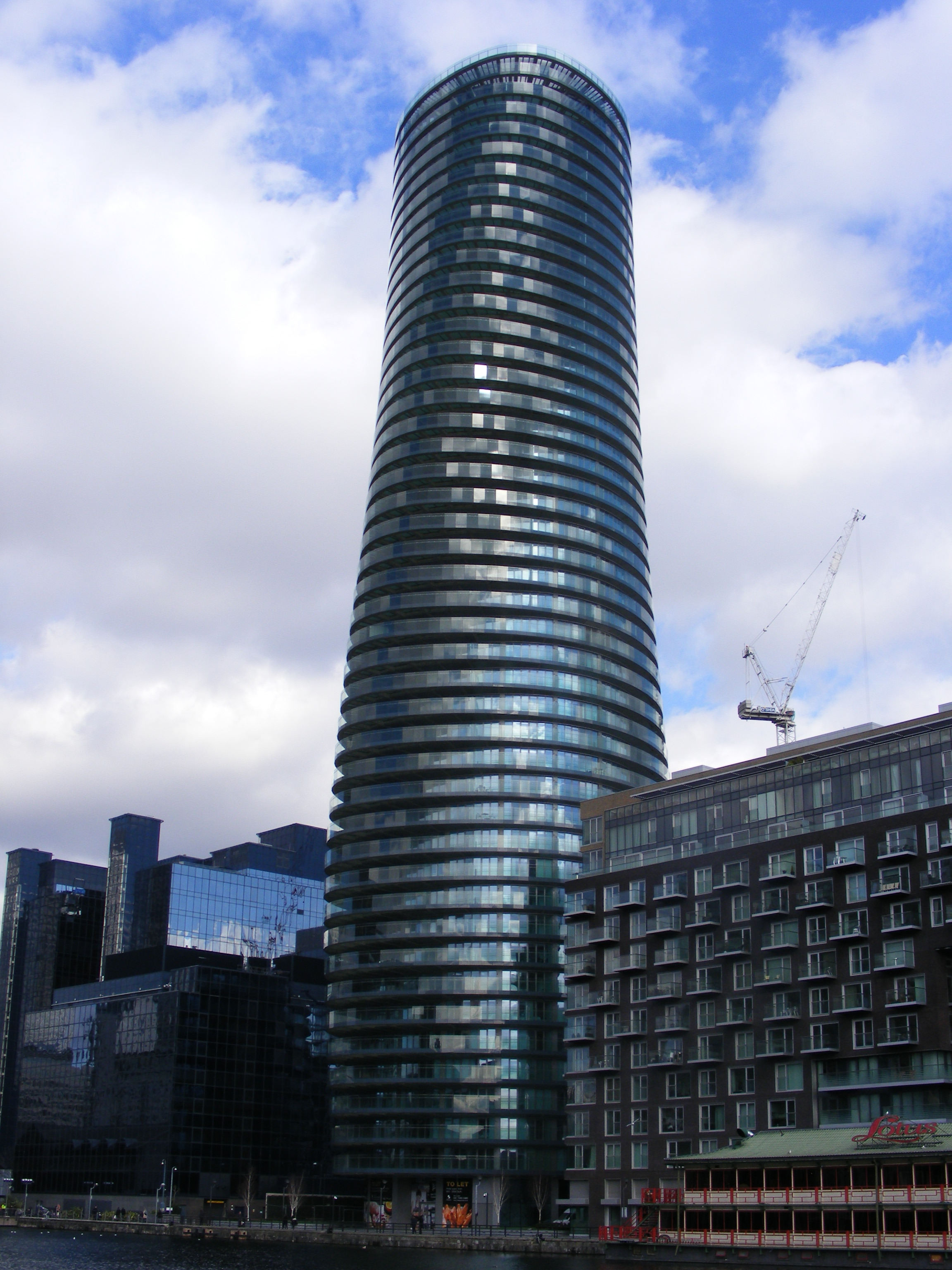

General information
- Status: Completed
- Location: London, E14; United Kingdom, 25 Crossharbour Plaza
- Coordinates: 51°29′50.8″N 0°0′54.3″W
- Construction started: 2013
- Completed: 2017
- Cost: £142m
- Landlord: Ballymore

Height
- Height: 149 m (489 ft)
- Top floor: 45

Technical details
- Floor count: 45, plus ground floor plus 2 basement floors
- Floor area: 145,858 m^{2} (1,570,000 sq ft)

Design and construction
- Architects: Skidmore Owings & Merrill SOM
- Architecture firm: Skidmore, Owings & Merrill
- Main contractor: O'Shea

Website
- https://www.galliardhomes.com/baltimore-tower

Baltimore Tower, also known as Arena Tower and nicknamed The Slinky due to its resemblance to the popular toy, is a high-rise residential skyscraper in Millwall on the Isle of Dogs, London, England. The building is located on a site that was previously the location of the London Arena. The 45-storey building comprises 366 residential apartments and is 149 meters in height. It was designed by American architecture firm Skidmore, Owings & Merrill.

Baltimore Tower won the Best Residential High Rise Award at the International Property Awards in 2017.

== Planning application ==
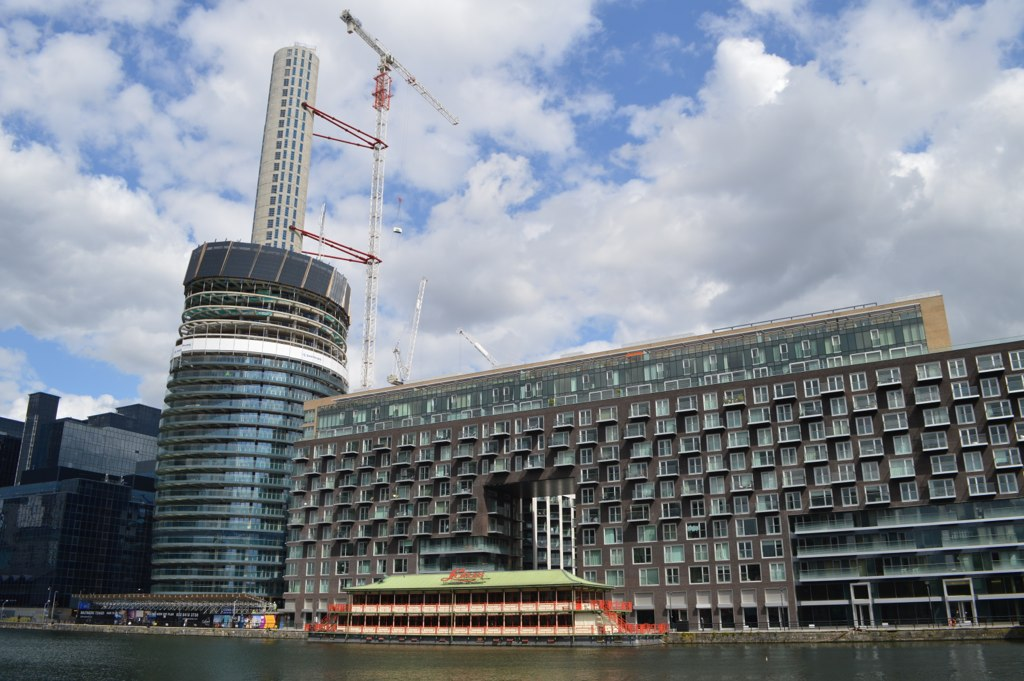
Arena Tower under construction

Ballymore London Arena Ltd applied for an amended planning application to Tower Hamlets in 2008.

== Gallery ==
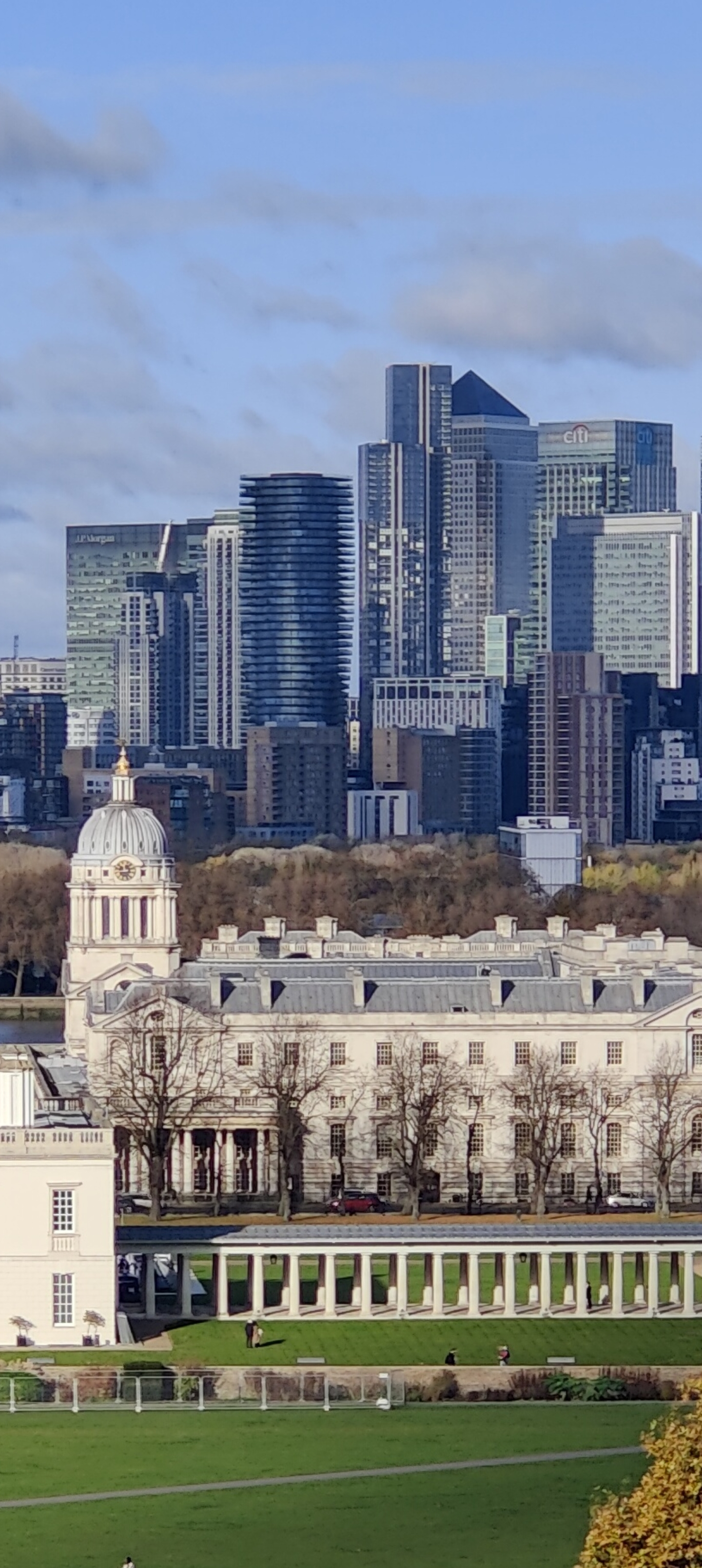
Arena Tower from Greenwich Park

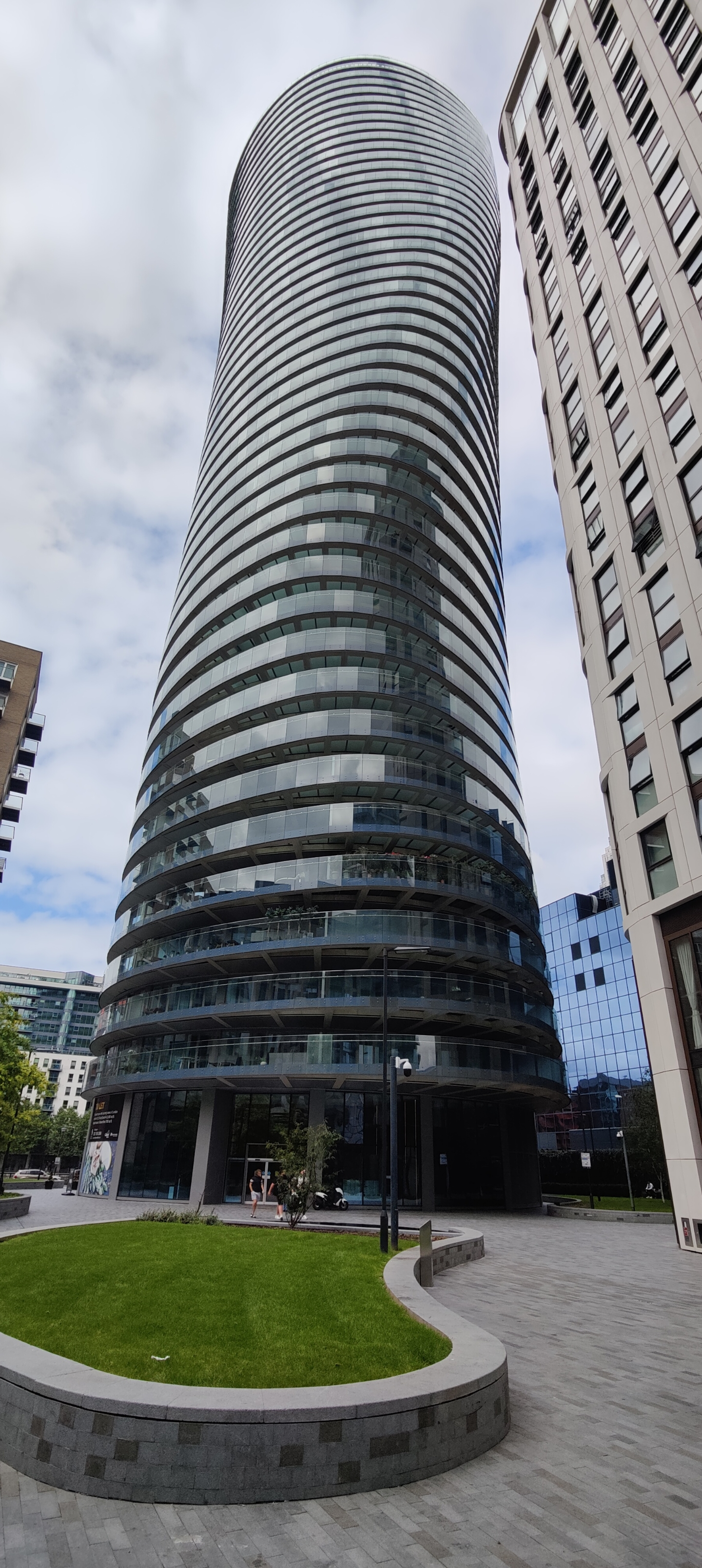
The entrance to Arena Tower

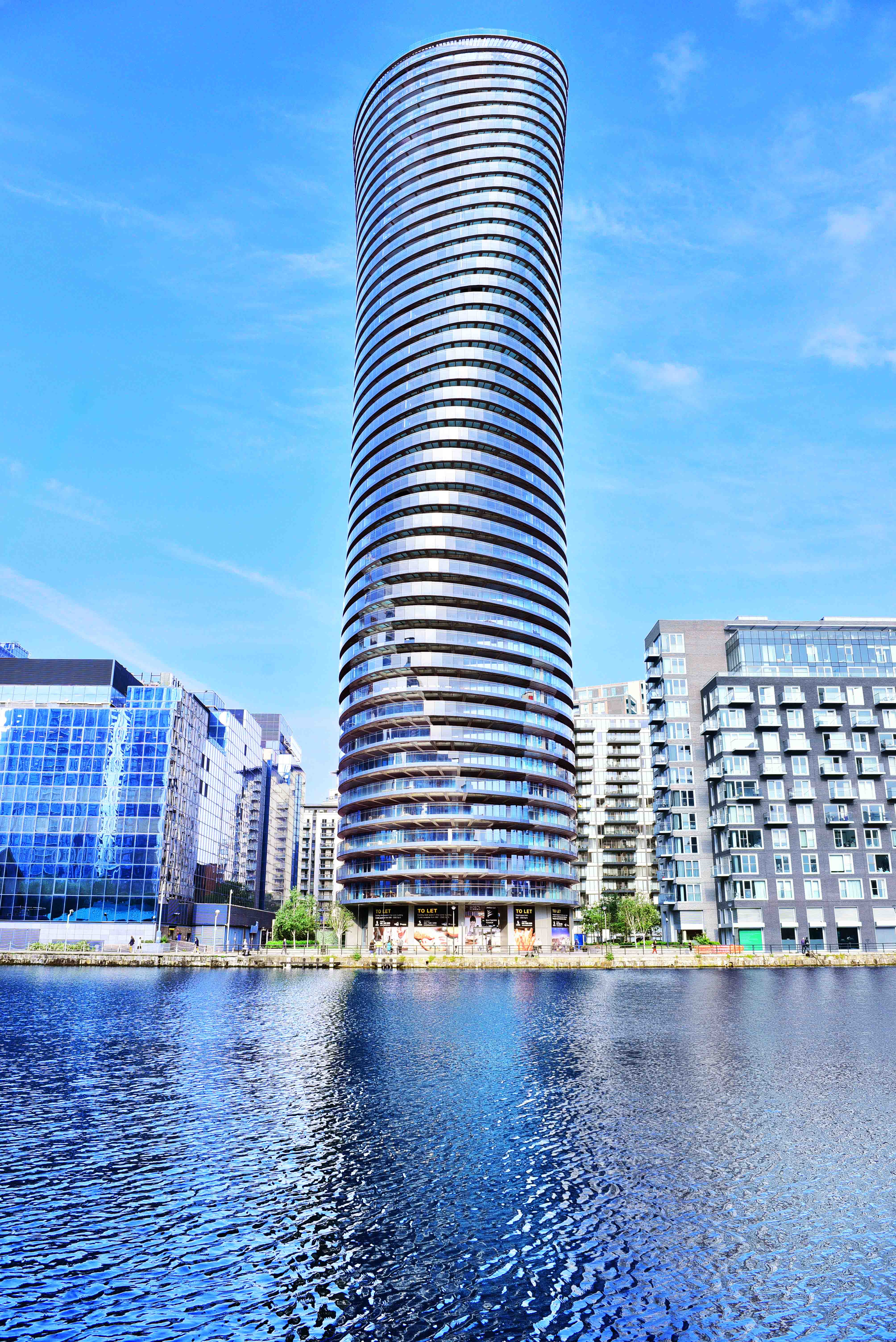
Millwall Inner Dock & Arena Tower. 25 June 2019.

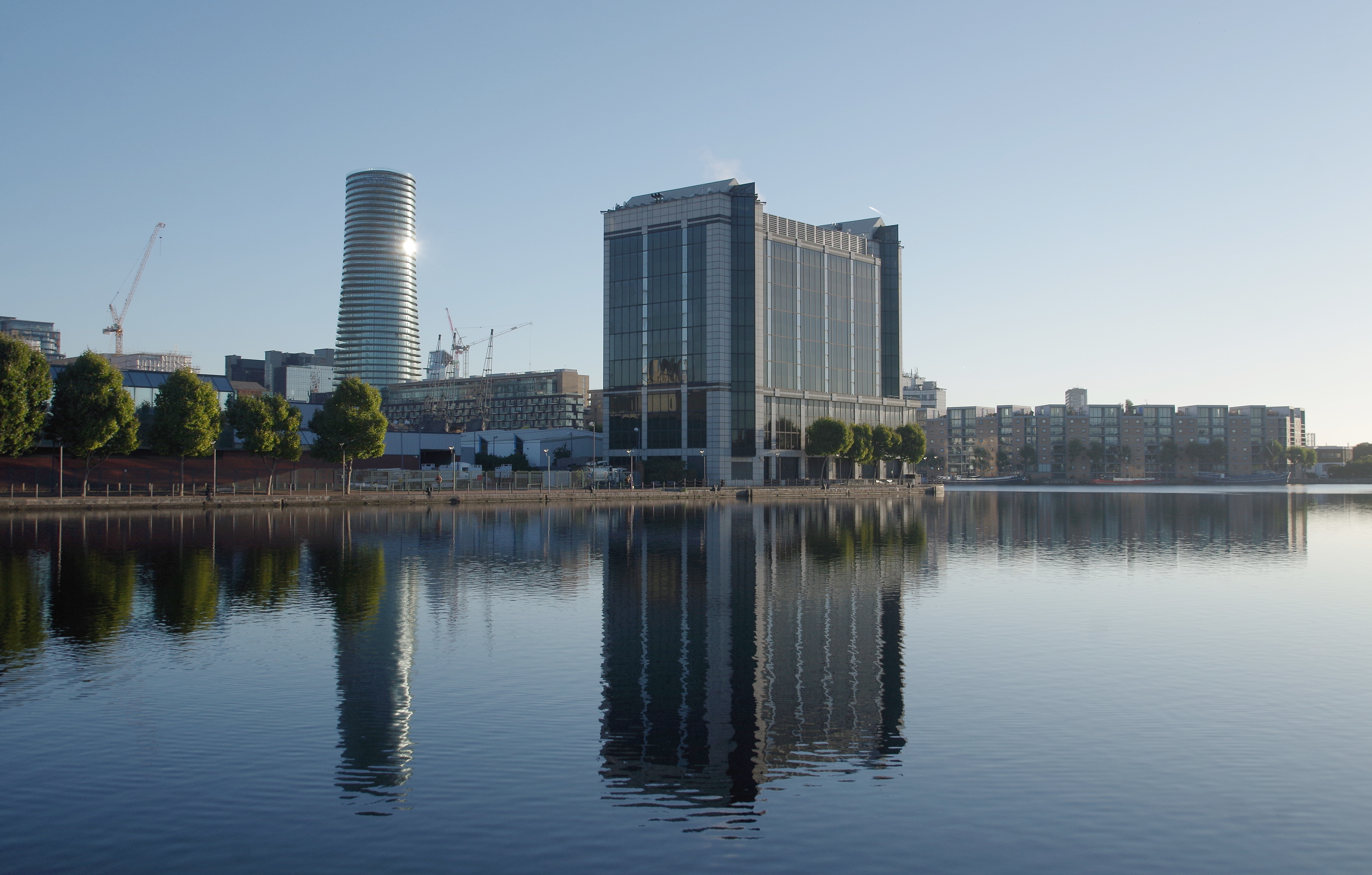
Reflections of Baltimore Tower in the still waters of Millwall Dock. 13 September 2016.

== See also ==
- List of twisted buildings
