= Avian Tower =

Skyscraper in Surabaya, Indonesia

- Menara Avian
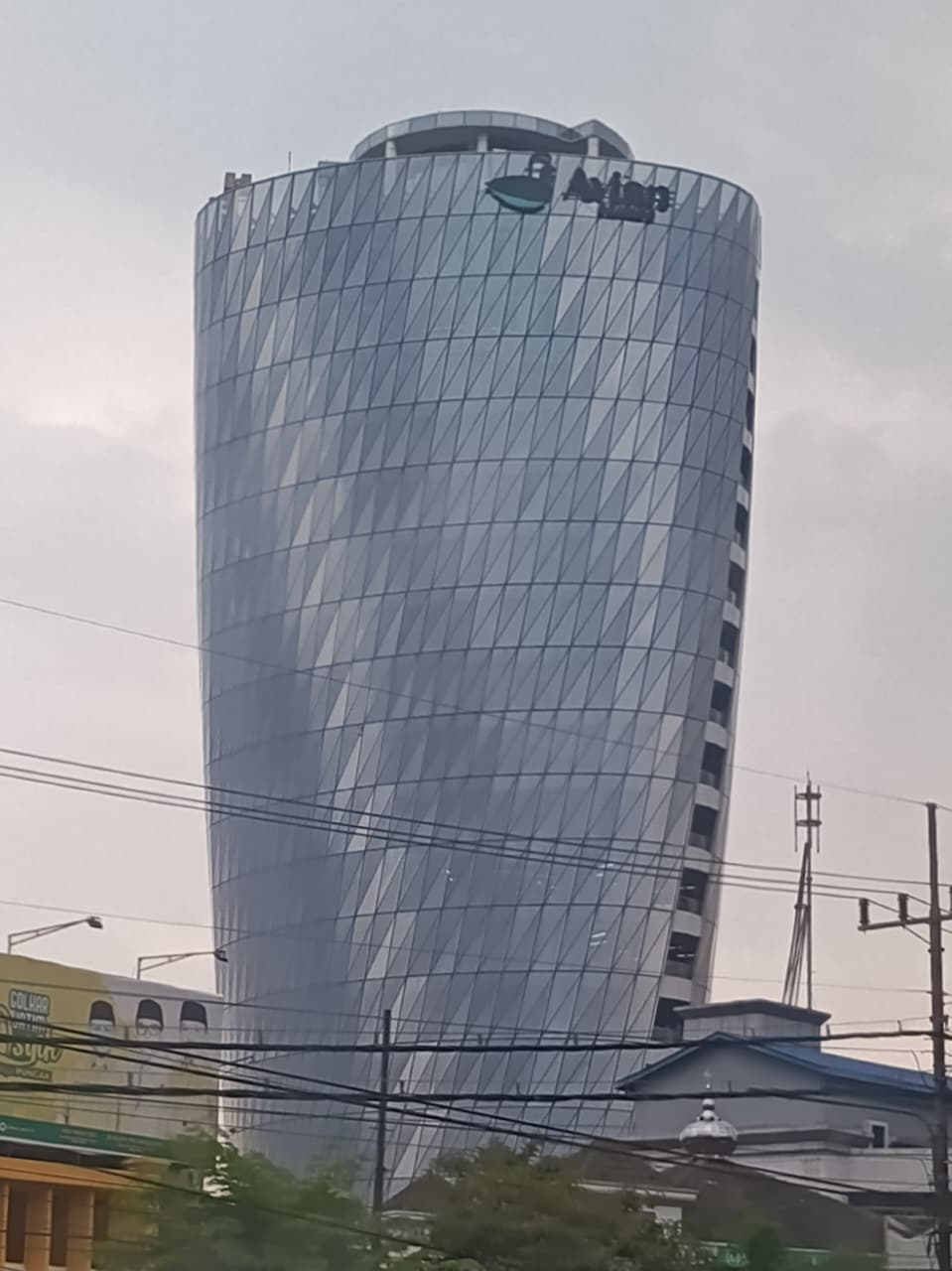
- Avian Tower in August 2018
- Interactive map of the Avian Tower area

General information
- Location: Surabaya, Jl. Menanggal Timur 1, Dukuh Menanggal, Indonesia
- Coordinates: 7°20′35″S 112°43′50″E
- Construction started: 2014
- Completed: 2018

Height
- Height: 84 meters (276 feet)

Technical details
- Floor count: 20

Website
- avianbrands.com/avian_tower

Avian Tower is a high-rise building located in Surabaya, Indonesia. It serves as the headquarters of the architectural paint brand « Avian Brands »

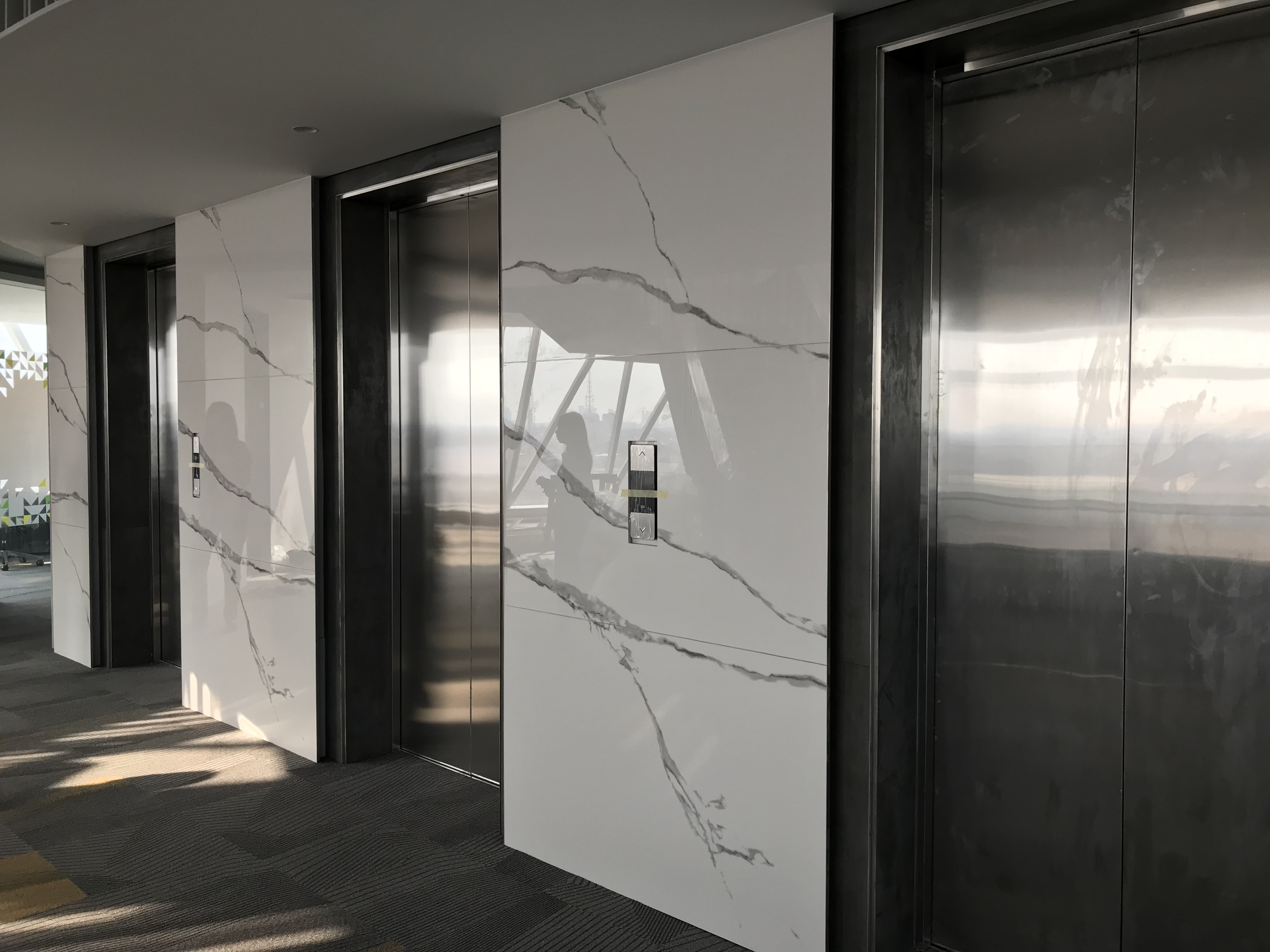
Interior (lift doors) of Avian Tower

The Tower is 84 meters tall, with 20 stories. The tower is a twisted tower, the floor rotates an average 3°, and the tower itself rotate 60°.

== Facilities ==
The lower floor of the tower is used as a podium and a car park. The podium contains retail outlets, banks, and clubs.

== See also ==
- List of twisted buildings
- List of tallest buildings in Surabaya
