= Avian Limited =

British aircraft manufacturer

- Company type: Private company
- Industry: Aerospace
- Founded: 1989
- Founder: Steve Elkins and Neil Hammerton
- Headquarters: Bradwell, Hope Valley, Derbyshire, United Kingdom
- Products: Hang gliders
- Services: Manufacture, service, repair and sales of hang gliders and associated equipment.
- Website: www.avianonline.co.uk

Avian Limited is a British aircraft manufacturer that produces a line of recreational and competition hang gliders. The company also markets recreational aviation products from other companies, including rigid wing hang gliders from A-I-R Atos.

Avian was founded in 1989 by Steve Elkins and Neil Hammerton. Avian acquired the manufacturing rights to the Aerial Arts Clubman hang glider and started by producing this design. This was quickly developed into the Avian Elan which remained in production for 10 years when it was replaced by the Avian Rio, later developed into the Rio2.

Steve Elkins continued as owner and Director of Avian until 2017 when it was bought by Tim Swait who also replaced him as Director.

== Aircraft ==
Summary of aircraft built by Avian
Model name	In production	Type
Avian Puma	2016 to date	Advanced/intermediate level hang glider
Avian Evo3	2016 to date	Advanced level hang glider
Avian Fly	2012 to date	Novice level hang glider
Avian Rio2	2011 to date	Intermediate level hang glider
Avian Rio	1999-2010	Novice/Intermediate level hang glider
Avian Cheetah	1999-2005	Advanced level hang glider
Avian Java	1995-1999	Advanced level hang glider
Avian Amour	1991-1998	Advanced/Intermediate level hang glider
Avian Elan	1989-1998	Novice/intermediate level hang glider
Avian Clubman	1989	Novice level hang glider
