= Avian (given name) =

Russian masculine first name

Avian (Russian: Авиа́н) is a Russian masculine first name. It was included into various, often handwritten, church calendars throughout the 17th–19th centuries, but was omitted from the official Synodal Menologium at the end of the 19th century.

It is possibly derived from the Greek word meaning not to live as a falsehood. Alternatively, it is possible that it was used as a name wishing someone long life.
